= Năstase cabinet =

Romanian government cabinet 2000–2004

Năstase
- 115th Cabinet of Romania

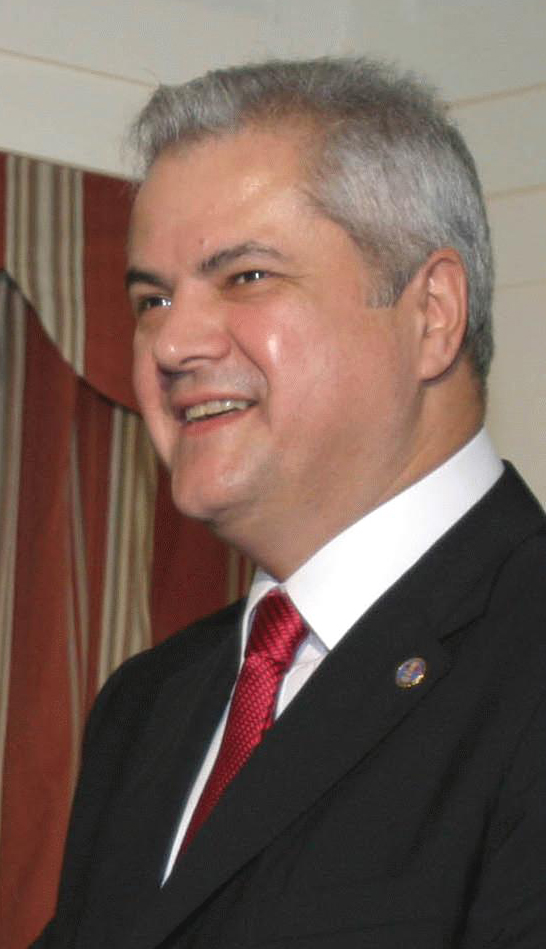
- Date formed: 28 December 2000
- Date dissolved: 21 December 2004

People and organisations
- Head of state: Ion Iliescu
- Head of government: Adrian Năstase
- Ministers removed: 22
- Total no. of members: 30
- Member party: PDSR, PSDR, later PSD+PUR
- Status in legislature: Coalition/Minority
- Opposition party: PNL, UDMR/RMDSZ, PD, PRM
- Opposition leader: Theodor Stolojan, Traian Băsescu, Corneliu Vadim Tudor

History
- Election: 26 November 2000
- Outgoing election: 28 November 2004
- Legislature term: 2000–2004
- Budget: Four
- Predecessor: Isărescu
- Successor: Tăriceanu I

The Năstase Cabinet was a cabinet of ministers led by Adrian Năstase that governed Romania from 28 December 2000 to 29 December 2004 during the third term of President Ion Iliescu. It was a minority cabinet formed by the winner of the 2000 parliamentary elections, PDSR, which included also members of other parties, non-parliamentary parties (PSDR, PUR). It was supported by a legislative coalition which included PNL (only for three months) and UDMR.

== Members ==
Coalition members: PDSR/PSD, PSDR (merged into the PSD in 2001), and PUR

Prime Minister:

- Adrian Năstase

Ministers of State:

- Alexandru Athanasiu
- Ioan Rus
- Marian Săniuță
- Dan Ioan Popescu
- Ioan Talpeș

Ministers:

- Rodica Stănoiu/Cristian Diaconescu (Justice)
- Ioan Mircea Pașcu (Defense)
- Mihai Tănăsescu (Finance)
- Răzvan Theodorescu (Culture)
- Miron Mitrea (Public Works and Transport)
- Ilie Sârbu/Petre Daea (Agriculture)
- Daniela Bartoș/Mircea Beuran/Ionel Blănculescu/Ovidiu Brânzan (Health)
- Mircea Geoană (Foreign Affairs)
- Dan Ioan Popescu (Economy and Commerce)
- Marian Sârbu/Elena Dumitru/Dan Mircea Popescu (Labor)
- Dan Nica/Silvia Adriana Țicău (Communications)
- Aurel-Constantin Ilie/Petru Lificiu/Ilie Sârbu/Speranța Ianculescu (Environment)
- Șerban Mihăilescu/Eugen Bejinariu (Coordinating the General Secretariat of the Government)
- Ioan Rus/Marian Săniuță (Interior)
- Ecaterina Andronescu/Alexandru Athanasiu (Education)
- Hildegard Puwak/Vasile Pușcaș/Alexandru Fărcaș (European Integration)
- Vasile Dâncu (Public Information)
- Octav Cozmâncă (Public Administration)
- Acsinte Gaspar (Relation with Parliament)
- Silvia Ciornei (Small and Medium Enterprises)
- Georgiu Gingăraș (Youth and Sport)
- Dan-Matei Agathon (Tourism)

Minister-Delegates:

- Gabriel Oprea/Gheorghe Emacu (Public Administration)
- Eugen Dijmărescu/Vasile Radu (Commerce)
- Acsinte Gaspar/Șerban Nicolae (Relation with Parliament)
- Vasile Pușcaș (Chief Negotiator with the EU)
- Ovidiu Muşetescu (Authority for Privatization)
- Ionel Blănculescu (Coordinating Control Bodies)
- Marian Sârbu/Bogdan Niculescu-Duvăz (Relation with Social Partners)
- Șerban Valeca (Research Activity)
