= Miroslava Șandru =

Miroslava Olga Șandru
- Born: 16 May 1916; Stârcea, Duchy of Bukovina, Austria-Hungary
- Died: 25 March 1983 (aged 66); Rădăuţi, Suceava, Romania
- Occupations: Ethnographer, folklorist
- Spouse(s): Hariton Borodai; Daniel Șandru

Miroslava Olga Șandru (1916-1983) was a Romanian ethnographer and folklorist of Ukrainian descent.

== Biography ==
=== Early life ===
Miroslava-Olga Copaciuc was born on May 16, 1916, in the village of Stârcea in the Duchy of Bukovina, under Austro-Hungarian rule (today Chernivtsi region, Ukraine), in the family of teachers Ioan and Elena-Olga Copaciuc. Her parents were transferred in 1920 to the village of Berhomet on Siret (today an urban locality in Vijnița district).

The village of Berhomet on Siret was then one of the largest mountain villages. The village's library has been operating in the village since 1898. The teachers Ioan and Elena Copaciuc were actively involved in the organization and good development of the entire cultural-educational activity, together with their two daughters: Miroslava-Olga, teacher, and Maria (Marusia), Miroslava's sister, student at the Conservatory of Chernivtsi. Through their contribution, a stage was built, the performance hall was enlarged and the roof was renovated. The choir and the theater circle were also set up with their help.

Miroslava spent her childhood and adolescence in the village of Berehomet. She attended the first three high school classes in the city of Siret, after which she attended and graduated from the Girls' Pedagogical School in Chernivtsi.

At the end of June 1940, northern Bukovina was occupied by the Soviet army. The localities of Berhomet on Siret were on the territory passed to the USSR. In the same year, the young Ukrainian poet Hariton Borodai was transferred to the local school as a history teacher. The two young men fell in love and soon married. Then, on October 11, 1941 (the day the poet turned 28), two twin sons were born, named Ostap and Andrei, after the characters in the novel Taras Bulba by Russian writer Nikolai Gogol. However, the youngest son, Andrei, died shortly after birth.

After the outbreak of the Romanian-Soviet war (June 22, 1941), the Romanian-German armies entered in Bukovina. Soon, the authorities of the time began to expel all the citizens of Bukovina from the USSR across the border. Hariton Borodai tried in vain to obtain the right to remain in Bukovina, arguing that he had formed a family in which a child also appeared, and his father-in-law, the teacher Ioan Copaciuc, was a reserve officer (lieutenant) in the Romanian Army, being mobilized within the Pyrotechnics in Bucharest. In the spring of 1942, Hariton Borodai was expelled across the border, settling in the town of Kamianets-Podilskyi in the Khmelnitsky region (USSR), which was under German occupation. There he worked as an editor for the Podolianin newspaper.

The only way to communicate between the Borodai spouses was correspondence. The poet sent letters to his wife in verse in which he expressed his hope for a better future. For Hariton Borodai, the period 1942-1944 was a fruitful poetic period. He regularly read the creations of his favorite poets: Taras Shevchenko, Ivan Franko, Alexander Pushkin, Mikhail Lermontov and Lord Byron.

In a March 2, 1943 postcard, Hariton Borodai expressed his feelings of loneliness and longing for his wife: “My beloved Miroslava. It's night. I sit alone in my room, I listen to the whisper of the river that has freed itself from the ice and the thought takes me to you, to my son. Sometimes I feel my loneliness so painful that I feel like putting a noose around my neck. Only the hope that you will come to me soon supports me."

In the spring of 1943, as a result of numerous interventions made to the competent authorities, Miroslava Borodai received permission to visit her husband and her child. The three lived together until the end of 1943, when the poet's wife and child returned to Berhomet on Siret with the retreating German troops. The poet remained in Kameneț-Podolsk until March 1944, when he finally managed to come to Berhomet.

Shortly afterwards, northern Bukovina was again occupied by the Soviets. The Borodai family, composed of the two spouses, a child, a mother-in-law and sister-in-law Maria (Marusia), boarded a freight car, leaving for refuge to Oltenia, where Prof. Dr. Vladimir Copaciuc, Borodai's brother, was already a refugee.

On April 9, 1944, a tragedy occurred in the Șimian railway station near the town of Turnu Severin. In a fit of jealousy, Taras Chisăliță, a student at the Polytechnic of Chernivtsi, Maria Copaciuc's boyfriend, committed a triple murder: he killed his girlfriend, her mother and Hariton Borodai with a few revolver bullets. He had jumped to defend the two women and was accidentally killed. After two months in prison, the killer committed suicide by strangling himself with a few strips of sheet.

Between 1944 and 1947, Miroslava Borodai lived in the cities of Craiova and Lugoj. At the end of the war, she returned to Bukovina, settling in the city of Siret and, upon request, was appointed a teacher in the village of Climăuți in Suceava County. She remarried in 1947, to the teacher Daniel Șandru (1914-2003). They had a son together, Bogdan Șandru (b. August 11, 1948, Climăuți - d. June 3, 1999, Câmpulung Moldovenesc). The two worked as teachers in the villages of Climăuți (1947-1951), Rogojești (1951-1952), Cândești (1952-1956) and Nisipitu (1956-1973), the last three localities having a majority population of ethnic Ukrainians. Miroslava Șandru retired in 1973, and thence moved to Rădăuți.

In all the localities where they worked, teachers Miroslava and Daniel Șandru actively participated in the cultural life of the inhabitants, setting up choral ensembles and artistic formations, holding conferences on various cultural and scientific topics in Ukrainian, organizing local folk art exhibitions, helping to preserve Ukrainian language and culture. Especially after 1960, the two spouses asked the state authorities for the right to teach Ukrainian as a mother tongue in schools, being harassed by the Securitate and often threatened with removal from their profession of teachers.

In the villages where she carried out her professional activity, Miroslava Șandru collected folk songs, publishing two collections of Ukrainian folklore from Romania: Oi kovala zozulecika (1974) and Spivanocikî moii liubi (1977). She and her husband organized an ethnographic museum of the Hutsul in Nisipitu.

In a 1982 interview, Miroslava Șandru revealed that she was not originally a Hutsul, but that she moved early on among them and thus was able to fully understand and appreciate their culture.

During her life, Șandru collected over 1,500 old embroidery patterns (stitches) from the Bukovina Hutsuls, being concerned with preserving the Hutsul folk art. The women of Nisipitu and the surrounding area brought her shirts and towels inherited from their ancestors. She made an album of Hutsul stitches, which was published only 22 years after her death, reportedly as a result of the indifferent attitude of the deputy Ștefan Tcaciuc, the president of the Union of Ukrainians in Romania.

Miroslava Șandru died on March 25, 1983. Her grave and the grave of her second husband, Daniel, is in the cemetery of Rădăuți.

Her name was included in the works Enciclopedia Bucovinei, vol. 2 (Ed. Princeps Edit, Iași, 2004) by Emil Satco and Literatura şi arta Bucovinei en nume (Ed. Bukrek, Cernăuți, 2005) by Mîkola Bohaiciuc. In the curriculum of History and traditions of the Ukrainian minority, which was approved by order of the Minister of Education and Research no. 3432 of February 27, 2003, there is a list of 38 Ukrainian personalities, among whom Miroslava Sandru.

On March 21, 2009, on the initiative of Ostap Borodai-Sandru and with the support of local authorities and teacher Gheorghe Cega, the Memorial Museum "Miroslava and Daniel Sandru" was inaugurated in the school building in Nisipitu. The exhibition includes numerous manuscripts, notes and personal items, large panels, photomontages with different themes, photo albums, a rich collection of stitch patterns from the album Hutsul stitches, various wipes, curtains, wooden objects and other items.

== Works ==
Miroslava Șandru was a well-known collector of Hutsul folklore. She published two collections of Ukrainian literary folklore from Romania:

- Oi kovala zozulecika (“How the cuckoo sings”) (Ed. Kriterion, Bucharest, 1974)
- Spivanocikî moii liubi (“My Dear Songs”) (Ed. Kriterion, Bucharest, 1977)
