= Ukrainian Orthodox Vicariate Sighetu Marmației =

- Православний Український вікаріат у Сиготі (uk); Vicariatul Ortodox Ucrainean Sighetu Marmației (ro)
- Type: Eastern Christianity
- Classification: Eastern Orthodox
- Orientation: Ukrainian Orthodox
- Scripture: Septuagint, New Testament
- Theology: Eastern Orthodox theology
- Polity: Episcopal
- Primate: Daniel, Patriarch of All Romania
- Distinct fellowships: Romanian Orthodox Church
- Parishes: 33
- Language: Ukrainian
- Liturgy: Byzantine Rite
- Headquarters: Sighetu Marmației, Maramureș County
- Origin: 1948
- Members: 53,300
- Priests: 27
- Places of worship: 33
- Official website: https://vicariatulortodoxucrainean.ro/

The Ukrainian Orthodox Vicariate Sighetu Marmației (Romanian: Vicariatul Ortodox Ucrainean Sighetu Marmației; Ukrainian: Православний Український вікаріат у Сиготі, romanized: Pravoslavnyy Ukrayins'kyy vikariat u Syhoti) is a vicariate of the Romanian Orthodox Church serving Eastern Orthodox believers from Romania's Ukrainian community.

Most of Romania's Ukrainians belonged to the Greek-Catholic Church until the newly established Communist regime outlawed it in 1948. Following their conversion to Orthodoxy, they were organised into a vicariate headquartered at Sighetu Marmației, including parishes in Maramureș, Transylvania, Crișana, and the Banat. In 1952, the vicariate became a Ukrainian archpriest's district, headquartered at Poienile de sub Munte and governed by the Diocese of Cluj. The district continued to function in this manner until 1990, receiving annual financial contributions from the Romanian Patriarchate.

After the 1989 fall of the Communist regime, the vicariate was re-established, again directed from Sighetu Marmaţiei and with two archpriest's districts, there and at Lugoj. As of 2008, there were 33 parishes operating in 33 church buildings, 27 priests, one nunnery at Rona de Sus, and approximately 53,300 members. The vicariate is under the Romanian Orthodox Church's jurisdiction, but is administratively autonomous. Unlike in the rest of the Romanian Orthodox Church, the Julian calendar is used.

The Lugoj district was established in November 1990, following efforts by the local Ukrainian cultural organization. Initially, there were six parishes; later, the one at Copăcele reverted to the ordinary structure of the Romanian Orthodox Church, but nine other parishes were added, the total reaching fourteen by 2005. The ones at Criciova, Cornuțel, and Zorile operate in pre-existing churches, while the remainder are new buildings, except the one at Remetea Mică, which holds services in the local Roman Catholic church.

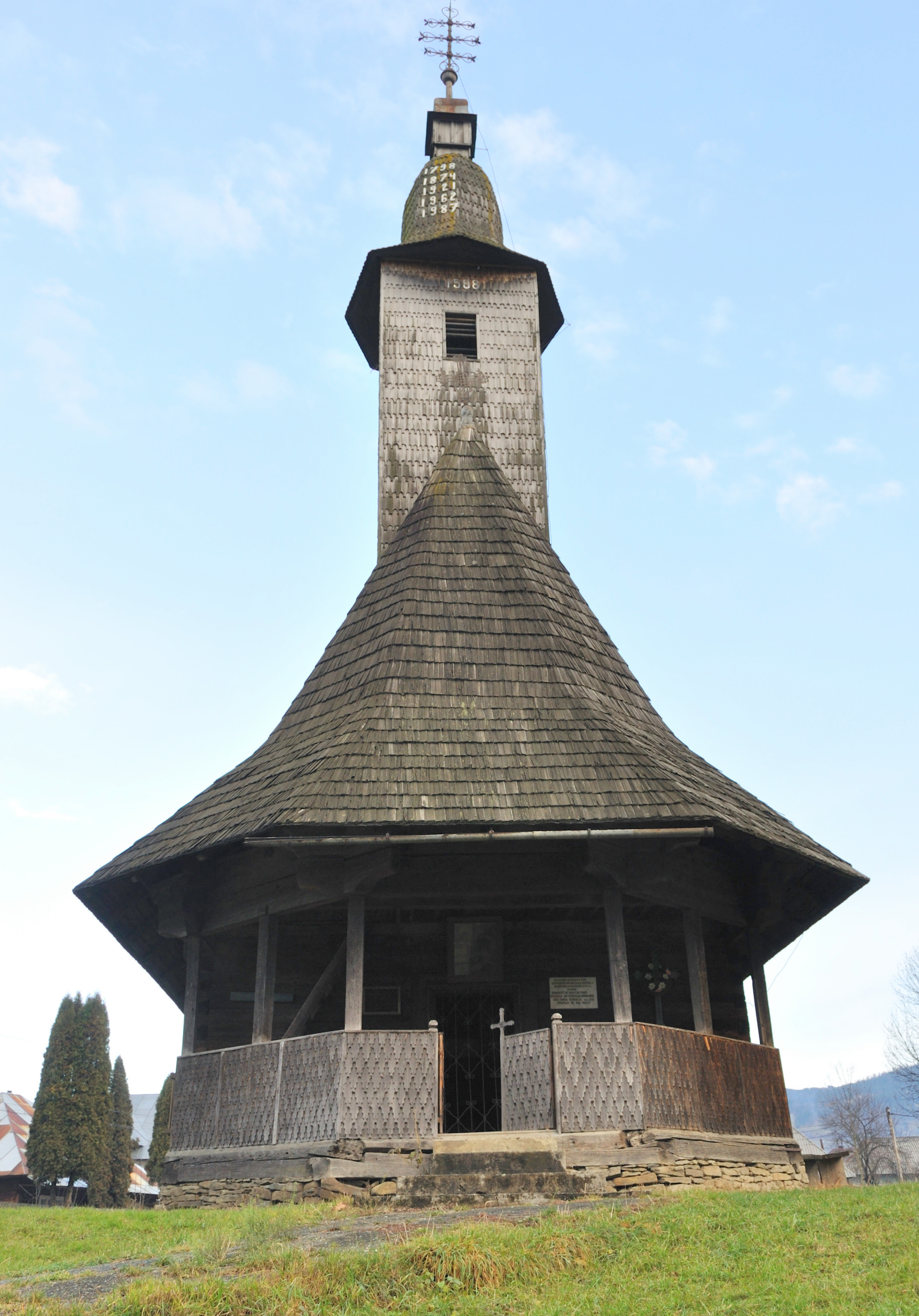
Wooden church in Poienile de sub Munte (1798)

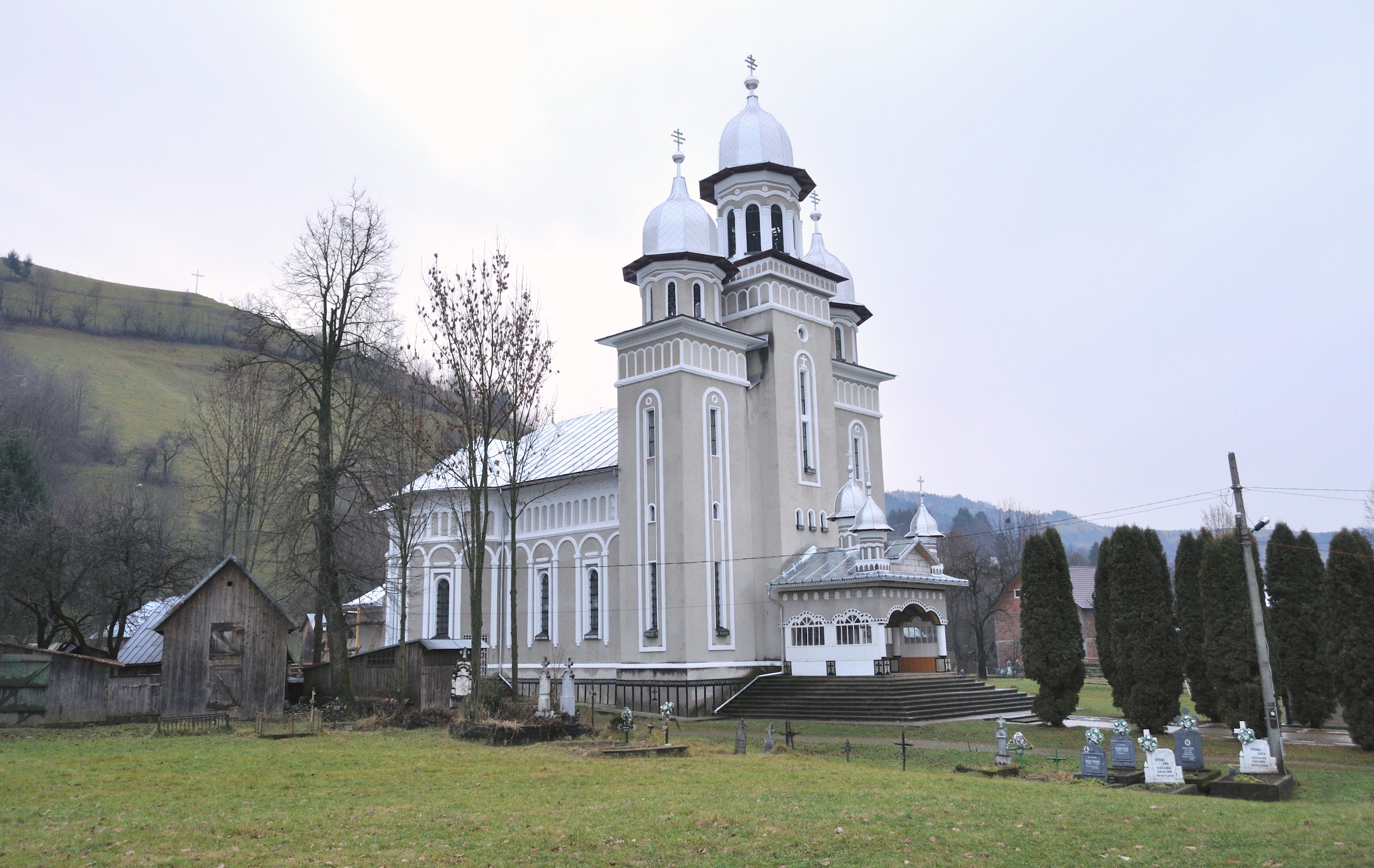
Stone church in Poienile de sub Munte

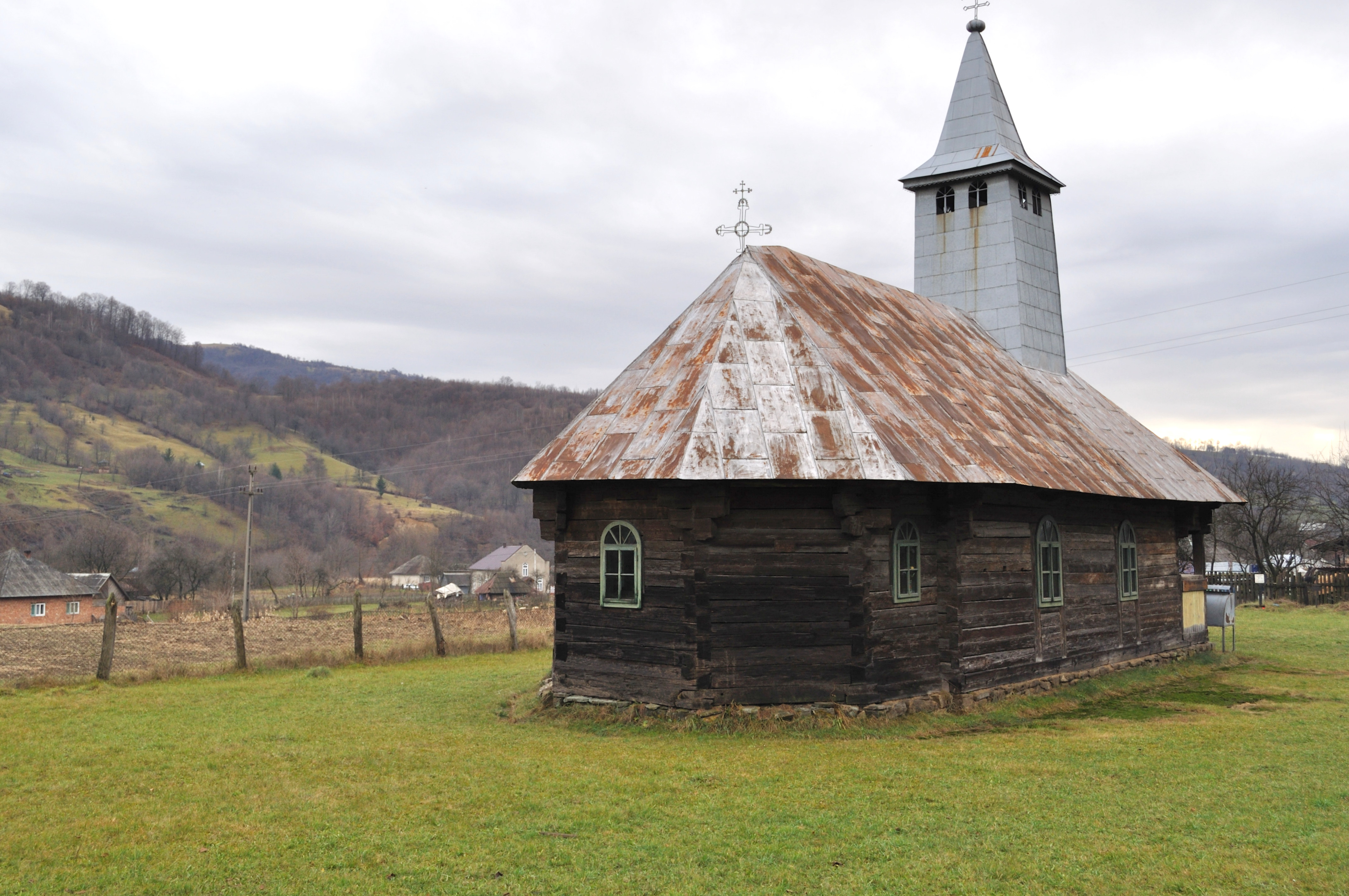
Wooden church in Ruscova (1954, incorporating elements dating to 1779)

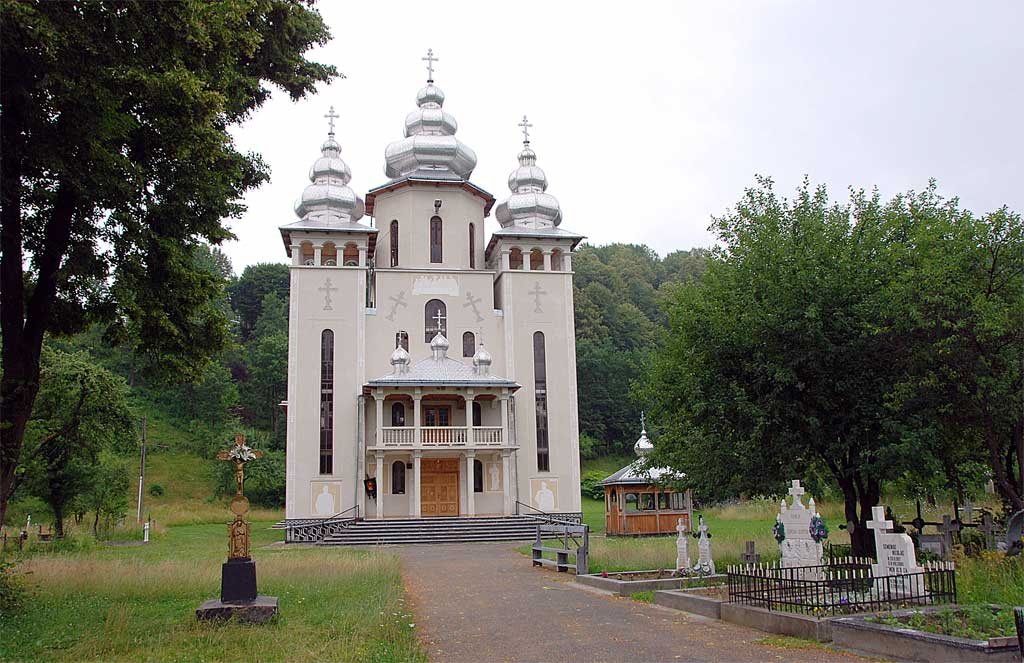
Church in Crasna Vișeului

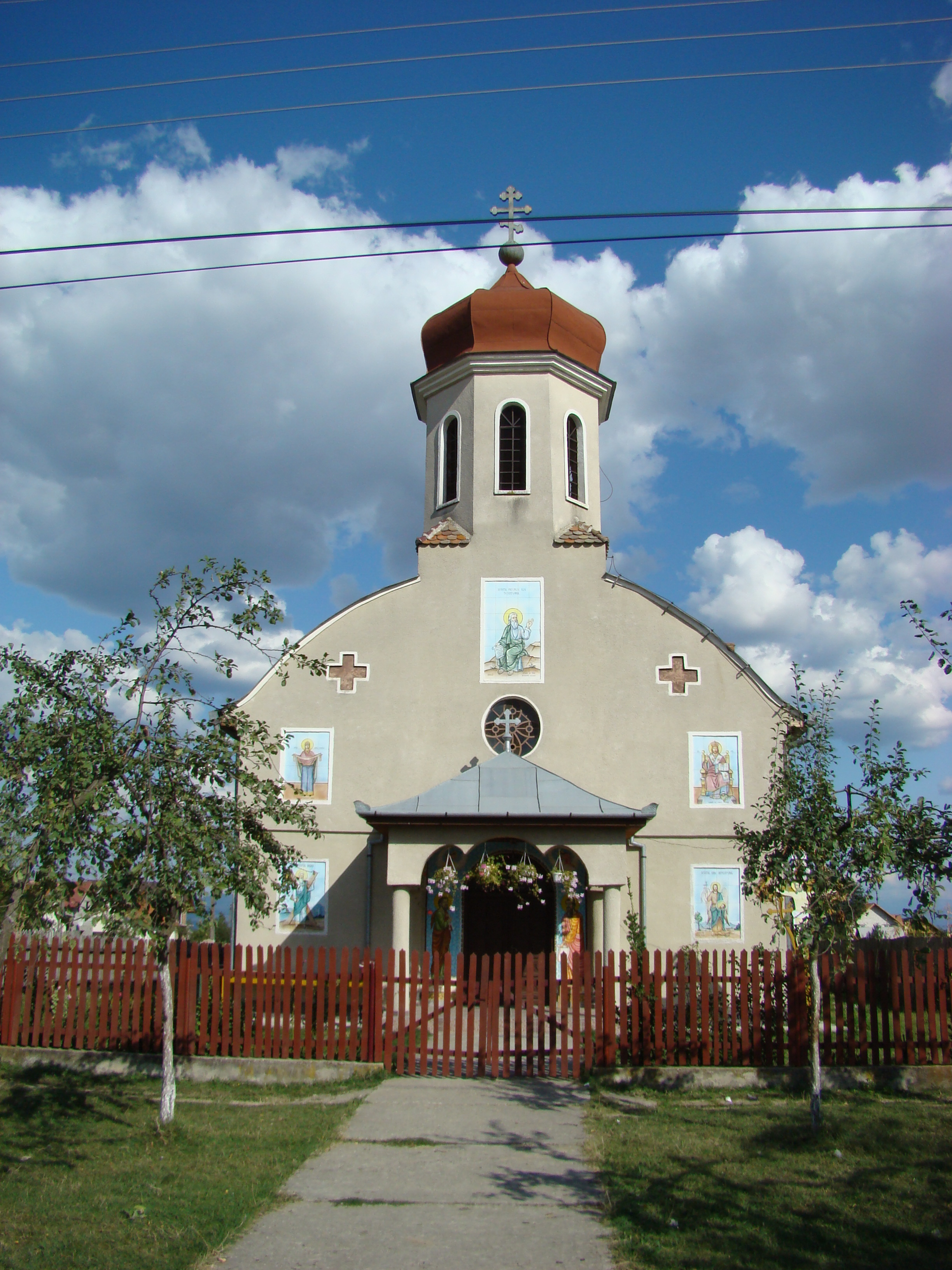
Church in Știuca
