= Repedea (disambiguation) =

Repedea may refer to several places in Romania:

- Repedea, a commune and a village in Maramureș County
- Repedea, a village in the commune Străoane, Vrancea County
- Repedea, one of the Seven hills of Iași
- the Repedea Hill Fossil Site near Iași
- Repedea (Ruscova), a river in Maramureș County
- Repedea (Vișeu), a river in Maramureș County
- Repedea (Latorița), a river in Vâlcea County
