= Beuran =

Beuran may refer to the following notable people:

- Beuran Hendricks (born 1990), South African cricketer
- Mircea Beuran (born 1953), Romanian surgeon
