= Ukrainians of Romania =

Ukrainians in Romania
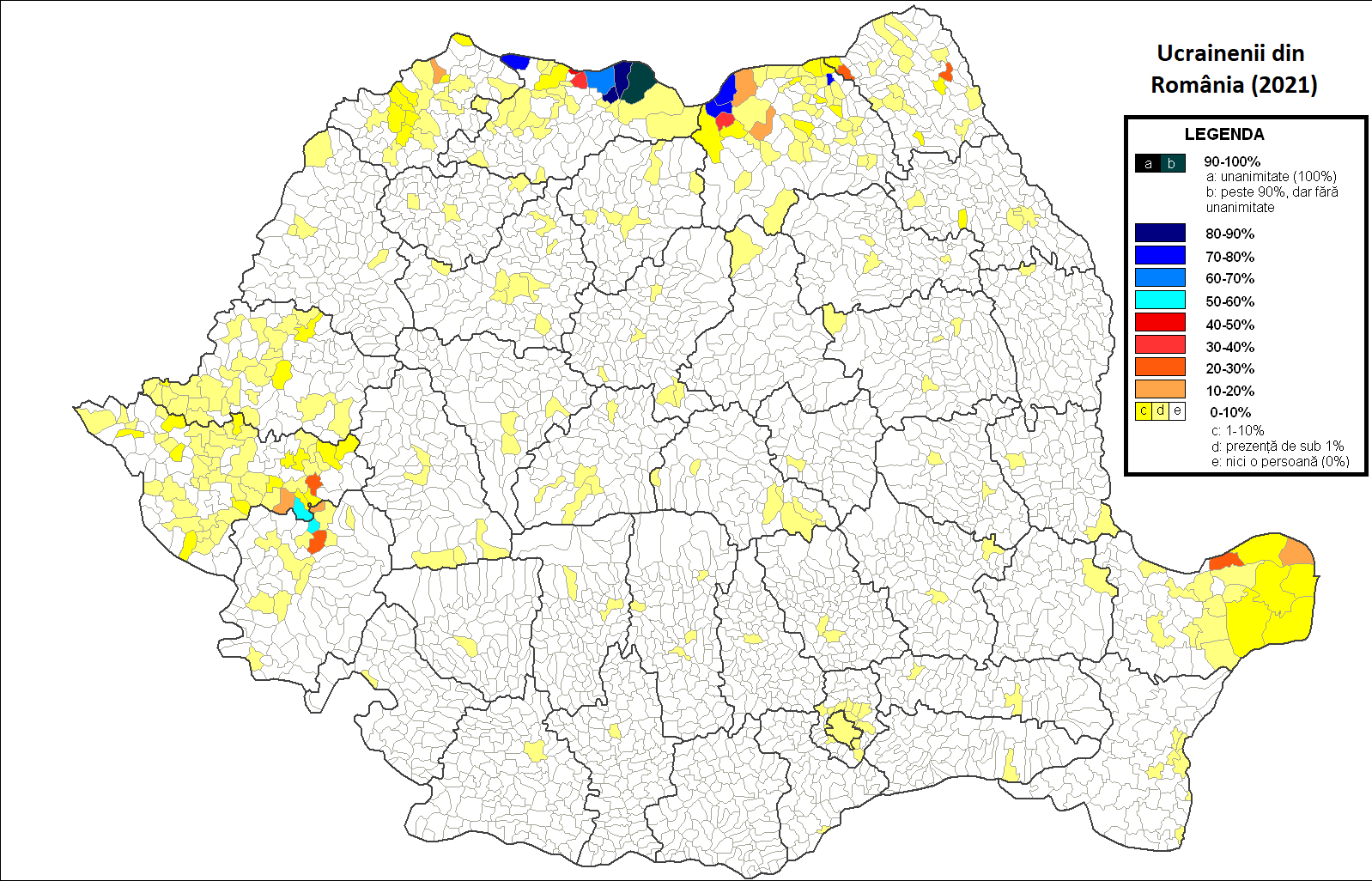
- Distribution of Ukrainians in Romania (2021 census)

Total population
- 45,835 (2021 census), 51,703 (2011 census) to 200,000 (unofficial estimate); 197,699 Ukrainian refugees who had obtained temporary protection and refugee status in Romania as of the end of October 2025.

Regions with significant populations
- northern Romania, in areas close to the Ukrainian border

Languages
- mainly Ukrainian and Romanian

Religion
- Ukrainian Orthodox, Pentecostal, Greek-Catholic and very small numbers of Jews and Muslims (mostly Tatars)

The Ukrainians of Romania (Ukrainian: Українці Румунії, romanized: Ukrayintsi Rumuniyi, Romanian: Ucrainenii din România) are the third-largest ethnic minority in Romania. According to the 2011 Romanian census they number 51,703 people, making up 0.3% of the total population. According to the 2021 Romanian census, there were 45,835 people who identified themselves officially as Ukrainians (0.24%), and 40,861 who declared that their language was Ukrainian. Ukrainians claim that the number is actually 250,000–300,000. Ukrainians mainly live in northern Romania, in areas close to the Ukrainian border. Over 60% of all Romanian Ukrainians live in Maramureș County (31,234), where they make up 6.77% of the population. According to the U.S. Census Bureau, in 2015, there were 345 ethnic Ukrainians born in Romania who lived in the United States of America at that time.

Sizable populations of Ukrainians are also found in Suceava County (5,698 people), Timiș County (5,953), Caraș-Severin County (2,600), Satu Mare County (1,397), Tulcea County (1,317), and Arad County (1,295). Ukrainians make up a majority in seven communes of Maramureș County (Bistra, Bocicoiu Mare, Poienile de sub Munte, Remeți, Repedea, Rona de Sus, and Ruscova) and three in Suceava County (Bălcăuți, Izvoarele Sucevei, and Ulma), as well as in Știuca, Timiș and Copăcele, Caraș-Severin. According to the 2002 census, 79% of Ukrainians were Eastern Orthodox, organized into the Ukrainian Orthodox Vicariate Sighetu Marmației; 10% Pentecostal; 2.8% Greek-Catholic, organized into the Ukrainian Greek-Catholic Vicariate Rădăuți; 2.1% Seventh-day Adventist; 1.2% Lipovan Orthodox and 2.9% stated they belonged to "another religion".

A second group of Ukrainians in Romania live in the Dobruja region of the Danube Delta. These are descendants of Zaporozhian Cossacks who fled Russian rule in the 18th century. In 1830, they numbered 1,095 families. Over the years they were joined by other peasants fleeing serfdom in the Russian Empire. In 1992, their descendants numbered four thousand people according to official Romanian statistics, while the local community claims to number 20,000. Known as Rusnaks, they continue to pursue the traditional Cossack lifestyle of hunting and fishing.

During the interwar period, tens of thousands of refugees from the USSR, mostly ethnic Romanians, Ukrainians, Russians, Jews, Tatars and others (many of them coming from Soviet Ukraine) migrated to Romania.

As an officially recognised ethnic minority, Ukrainians have one seat reserved in the Romanian Chamber of Deputies. Ștefan Tcaciuc held the seat from 1990 until his 2005 death, when he was replaced by Ștefan Buciuta. The Union of Ukrainians of Romania obtained 5,457 votes (0.09%) in the Chamber of Deputies election of 2020.

After 1989, a significant number of Ukrainian citizens (including ethnic Romanians/Moldovans from Ukraine) started immigrating to Romania (students, migrant workers, businesspeople, refugees). As of 2019, there are at least 18,000 Ukrainian-born people living in Romania, most of them living in large cities, such as Bucharest, Cluj-Napoca, or Timișoara.

Around 600,000 Ukrainians have fled to Romania since the start of the Russo-Ukrainian War. On 8 May 2026, Ukraine included Romania and 27 other named countries in its list of states whose citizens could hold dual citizenship. This made ethnic Ukrainians from Romania able to use a simplified procedure to become Ukrainian citizens.

== Notable people ==
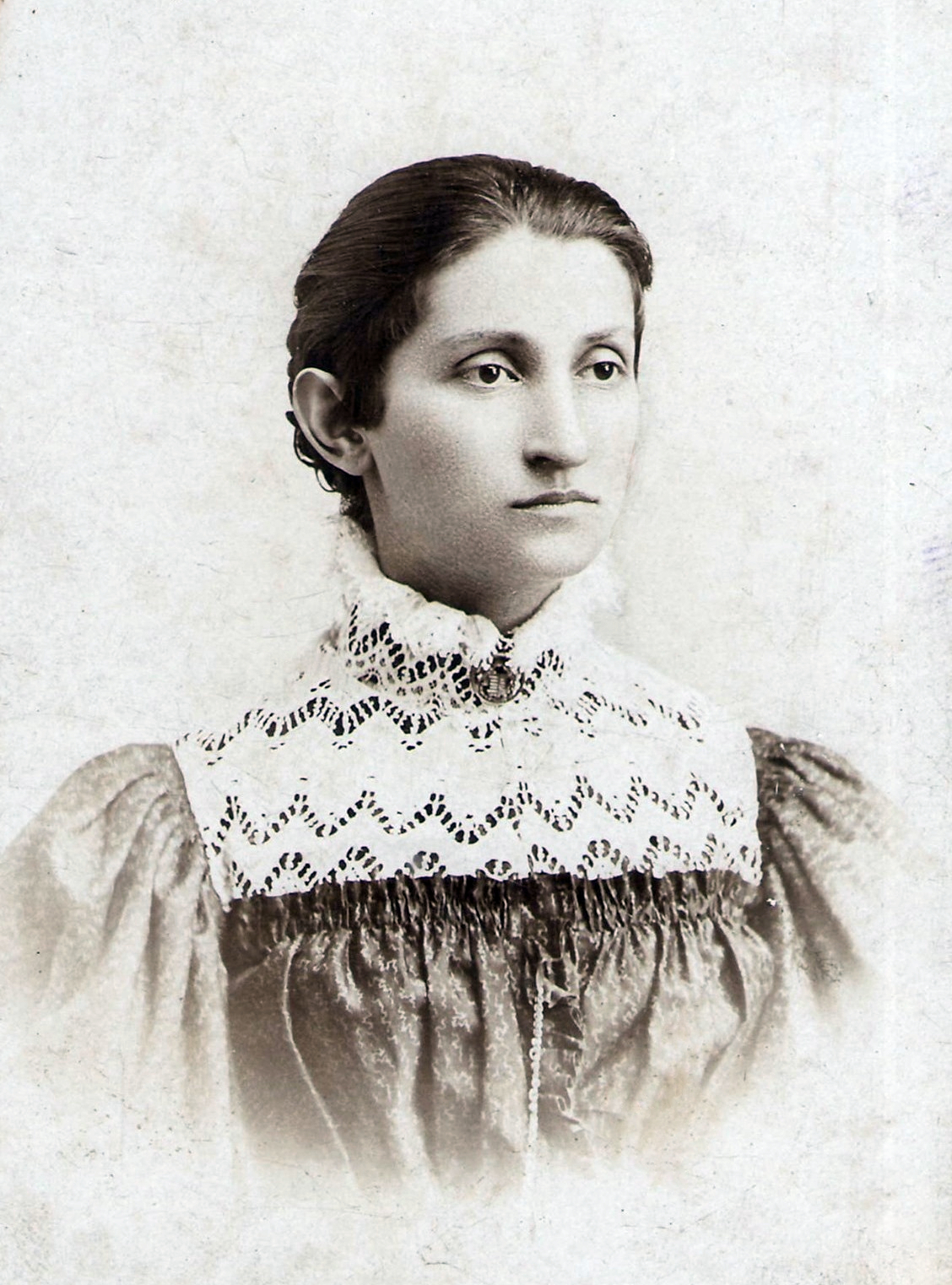
Olha Kobylianska

- Antin Lukasevych - politician
- Mykhailo Ostrohradskyi - Ukrainian naval officer
- Emil Bodnăraș - politician and army officer
- Ioan Dzițac - professor of mathematics and computer science
- Dmytro Hnatyuk - baritone opera singer
- Vasile Hutopilă - painter
- Mykhailo Mykhailyuk - poet, literary critic
- Simion Ismailciuc - sprint canoeist, won the Summer Olympics, two World Championships and three European Championships
- Olha Kobylianska - writer and feminist
- Anna Lesko - singer
- Ivan Pavlovich Maksimovich - Colonel of the UGA
- Miroslava Șandru - ethnographer and folklorist
- Nicodemus (Rusnak) - Ukrainian Orthodox metropolitan bishop of Kharkiv and Bohodukhiv

== See also ==
- Romania–Ukraine relations
- Ukrainian diaspora
- Danubian Sich
- Pokuttia-Bukovina dialect
- Romanians in Ukraine
- Moldovans in Ukraine
- Rusyns of Romania
