= Tatomirești =

Tatomireşti may refer to several villages in Romania:

- Tatomireşti, a village in Brădeşti Commune, Dolj County
- Tatomireşti, a village in Rebricea Commune, Vaslui County
