= Cozmâncă =

Cozmâncă is a Romanian surname. Notable people with the surname include:

- Octav Cozmâncă (born 1947), Romanian politician
- Sebastian Cozmâncă (born 1992), Romanian Muay Thai kickboxer
