= Piscani =

Piscani may refer to several villages in Romania:

- Piscani, a village in Dârmănești Commune, Argeș County
- Piscani, a village in Brădeşti Commune, Dolj County
- Piscani, a village in the town of Scorniceşti, Olt County
