= Ioan Dzițac =

Romanian mathematician (1953–2021)

Ioan Dzițac (14 February 1953 – 6 February 2021) was a Romanian professor (of Ukrainian descent) of mathematics and computer science. He obtained his B.S. and M.Sc. in Mathematics (1977) and PhD in Computer Science (2002) from Babeș-Bolyai University of Cluj-Napoca. He was a professor at the Aurel Vlaicu University of Arad and part of the leadership of Agora University in Oradea until his sudden death in 2021.

== Education and career ==
Dzițac was born in Poienile de sub Munte, Maramureș County. After attending elementary school in Repedea (1960–1968), he studied at the Dragoș Vodă High School in Sighetu Marmației (1968–1972) and then at the Faculty of Mathematics, Babeș-Bolyai University (1972–1977). In 2002 he obtained his PhD in computer science at the Faculty of Mathematics and Informatics, Babeș-Bolyai University with thesis "Methods for parallel and distributed computing in solving operational equations" under the supervision of Grigor Moldovan.

Between 1977 and 1991, Dzițac taught mathematics in pre-university education, obtaining a permanent teacher certification on all levels (1980), second grade teacher certification (1985), and first grade teacher certification (1990). In 1986 he received the title of Distinguished Professor.

Since 1991, he accessed through competition in the higher education system the position of Lecturer (1991–2003) and associate professor (2003–2005) at the University of Oradea, associate professor (2005–2009) at Agora University, and then Professor (2009–2021) at Aurel Vlaicu University of Arad. At Agora University he founded, together with Florin Gheorghe Filip and Mișu-Jan Manolescu, the International conference on Computers, Communications & Control (ICCCC) and the International Journal of Computers, Communications & Control (IJCCC) journals which, in less than two years, have been covered by Thomson ISI. Since 2006 he was the associate editor-in-chief of the IJCCC journal until his sudden death in 2021.

Dzițac was a visiting professor at the Chinese Academy of Science (2013–2016), as well as a consulting member of the Hoseo University in South Korea.

== Management positions ==
In 1996, Dzițac was elected vice president of the Romanian Society of Applied and Industrial Mathematics (ROMAI), a position he occupied until 2011 (he was re-elected in 1999–2009). In April 2004, he was elected as director of the Department of Mathematics and Computer Science of the University of Oradea, a position he occupied for a year, and in October 2005 he was elected head of department at Agora University. Since October 2009 he was the director of the Centre "Agora Research & Development".

As of 2012, Dzițac was rector of Agora University.

== Awards ==
In recognition of his merits, Dzițac was awarded the following degrees and titles (see [1])

- Title of “Distinguished Professor” accorded by the Romanian Ministry of Education (1988)
- The Award for Young Researcher accorded by the Romanian Society of Applied and Industrial Mathematics (2003)
- “SIVECO” Popularity Award accorded for an informatics product for E-Learning (2006)
- “Excellence Diploma” accorded by the Associations of the Economics Faculties from Romania (2007)
- “Excellence Diploma” EWNLC 2008 (2008)
- Title of “Teacher of the Year 2008” accorded by the Agora University Senate
- “Excellence Diploma” accorded by the “Aurel Vlaicu” University from Arad (2010)
- Senior Member of IEEE (2011)

== Published works ==
Dzițac was the author or co-author of over 50 scientific papers in mathematics, computer science, and didactics, including over 15 in the ISI. Dzițac was the author / co-author / editor of over 20 books on mathematics, computer science and didactics. May be mentioned:

- Monte Carlo Method: Hazard and Determinism (in collaboration, University of Oradea Publishing House, 2000)
- Parallel Computing (University of Oradea Publishing House, 2001)
- Didactics of Informatics (in collaboration, University of Oradea Publishing House, 2003)
- Proceedings of the 11th Conference on applied and industrial mathematics (CAIM 2003), Vol. 1–2 (in collaboration, University of Oradea Publishing House, 2003)
- Proceedings of International Conference on Computers and Communications-ICCC 2004 (in collaboration, University of Oradea Publishing House, 2004)
- Economic Mathematics ( Agora University Publishing House, 2005)
- Distributed Systems: Information Models (in collaboration, Agora University Publishing House, 2006)
- Distributed Systems: Mathematical Models (in collaboration, Agora University Publishing House, 2006)
- Parallel and Distributed Methods for Algebraic Systems Resolution ( Agora University Publishing House, 2006)
- Proceedings of International Conference on Computers, Communications & Control-ICCCC 2006 (in collaboration, Agora University Publishing House, 2006),
- Proceedings of International Conference on Computers, Communications & Control-ICCCC 2008 (in collaboration, Agora University Publishing House, 2008),
- From Natural Language to Soft Computing: New Paradigms in Artificial Intelligence (in collaboration, Romanian Academy Publishing House, 2008) etc.

== Family life ==
Dzițac married Karla Dzițac, with whom he had two children: Renata Moca and Cristian Dzițac. Dzițac divorced his first wife in the 1990s. In 1996, on 14 February, he married Simona Dzițac (an assistant professor of engineering at the University of Oradea) with whom he had another daughter, Domnica Ioana Dzițac (born January 30, 1999).

== Death ==
Dzițac died on 6 February 2021 due to a heart attack in Oradea, Romania, eight days short from his 68th birthday. He was greatly regretted by family, friends, collaborators, mentees and students. His work will remain as legacy.

== Notes ==
- Adelina GEORGESCU, Cătălin-Liviu BICHIR, George CÂRLIG, Romanian Mathematicians from everywhere, Ed. Power Flower, 2004,
- Personal website of Ioan Dzițac
- Romanian National Library
- Ioan Dzițac profile at Ad Astra
- ROMAI website
- Agora University
- ISI Web of Science RID
- "Aurel Vlaicu" University of Arad
- Prof.univ.Phd. Ioan Dzițac,
- Ioan Dzițac in Google Scholar Citations
