= Hildegard Puwak =

Romanian politician (1949–2018)

Hildegard Carola Puwak (16 September 1949–25 May 2018) was a Romanian politician, a member of the Social Democratic Party (PSD), who served as the Minister for European Integration from 2000 until October 2003 (as part of the Adrian Năstase cabinet). Puwak was of German ethnicity (Swabian) and represented Timiș County in the Chamber of Deputies from 1996 to 2004.

== Education and career ==
Puwak was born on 16 September 1949, in Reșița. She graduated in 1971 from the Bucharest Academy of Economic Studies (ASE), Faculty of Commerce, magna cum laudae, and in 1979 got a doctorate in economics from the same university. Between 1971 and 1992 she was a visiting professor at ASE, and also a research fellow at the National Institute of Economy and Life Standard Research in Bucharest. In 1992 she worked as a visiting professor at "a series of universities in the United States (Los Angeles, Cleveland, and Chicago) and Germany (Darmstadt)". Between 1993 and 1996 she was a Secretary of State in the Romanian government, working in the Department for Economic Reform. In 1996 she was elected to the Chamber of Deputies, and acted as Deputy chairman to the Commission for European Integration, and was also a member of the Commission for Economical Policy, Reform and Privatization.

== Corruption scandal ==
On 29 July 2003 a corruption scandal broke out when Adevărul newspaper accused Puwak of facilitating access for her husband's and her son's companies to some 150,000 non-reimbursable Euros through the "Leonardo da Vinci" European Union program, while she was in charge of those funds. Puwak denied the accusations, stating the applications had been submitted while she was an opposition MP. The opposition parties of that time, PD and PNL, demanded her resignation or dismissal. On 2 September, Puwak demanded that the anti-corruption prosecutors (PNA) investigate the charges, and on the same day Prime Minister Adrian Năstase declared that the cabinet had full confidence in Puwak. On 4 September, a team from the European Commission's Anti-Fraud Office (OLAF) arrived to investigate. OLAF spokesman Alessandro Buttice announced on 11 September that his office was opening a case meant to assist the Romanian authorities in investigating allegations against Puwak. On 13 October, PSD's Permanent Delegation (party leadership) decided to continue political support for her and Health Minister Mircea Beuran, awaiting the conclusion of the EU audit. Nevertheless, on 20 October, she resigned together with Beuran and Șerban Mihăilescu, the Secretary General of the Năstase government. The same day Năstase presented his proposal for replacements to president Ion Iliescu, leading to media speculation that the three were fired instead. Năstase commented that "They resigned to eliminate suspicions and the risk that the government will be forced to explain minor issues instead of taking care of important matters," referring to Romania's bid to join the EU.

On 30 October, the Greater Romania Party, supported by PD and PNL, tried to initiate a parliamentary inquiry commission on the scandal, but this effort was defeated by the majority of the Romanian Senate. On 19 December 2003 the anti-corruption investigation was closed by prosecutor Adrian Miclescu without filing any charges. The case was then reopened on 26 August 2005, after the new Justice Minister Monica Macovei fired him. Eventually the case went to trial, and Puwak's husband, Iosif Mihai Puwak, was sentenced in December 2007 to a 30-month suspended sentence for embezzling 39,000 euros from the EU da Vinci funds. He was also ordered to reimburse the money. He appealed, but the appeal was rejected by the Bucharest Court of Appeals on 4 June 2009. On 9 November 2009 her son Mihai Puwak was sentenced to a three-year suspended sentence for embezzling 32,160 euros from the same EU da Vinci funds, and ordered to reimburse the money. This sentence was final.
