= University of Arad =

University of Arad may refer to one of two institutions in Arad, Romania:

- Aurel Vlaicu University of Arad (public)
- Vasile Goldiș Western University of Arad (private)
