= Bejinariu =

Bejinariu is a Romanian surname. Notable people with the surname include:

- Eugen Bejinariu (born 1959), Romanian politician
- Viviana Iuliana Bejinariu (born 1994), Romanian rower
