= Cvașnița =

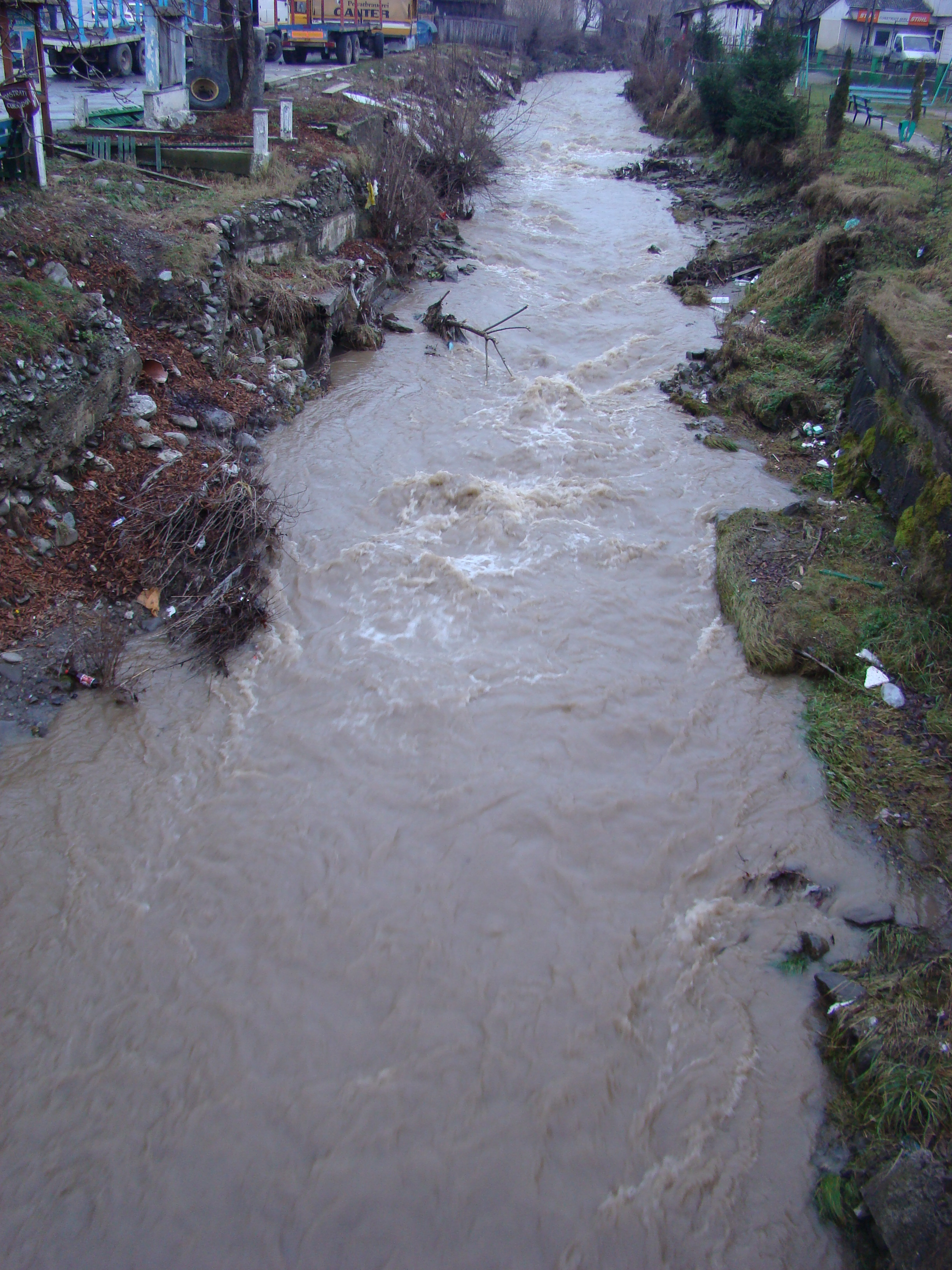

- Location within Romania

Location
- Country: Romania
- Counties: Maramureș County

Physical characteristics
- Mouth: Ruscova
  - coordinates: 47.8231°N 24.4341°E
- Length: 11 km (6.8 mi)
- Basin size: 35 km^{2} (14 sq mi)

Basin features
- Progression: Ruscova→ Vișeu→ Tisza→ Danube→ Black Sea

The Cvașnița is a left tributary of the Ruscova in Maramureș County, Romania. It flows into the Ruscova in Poienile de sub Munte. Its length is 11 km (6.8 mi) and its basin size is 35 km^{2} (14 sq mi).
