= Ruscova (river) =

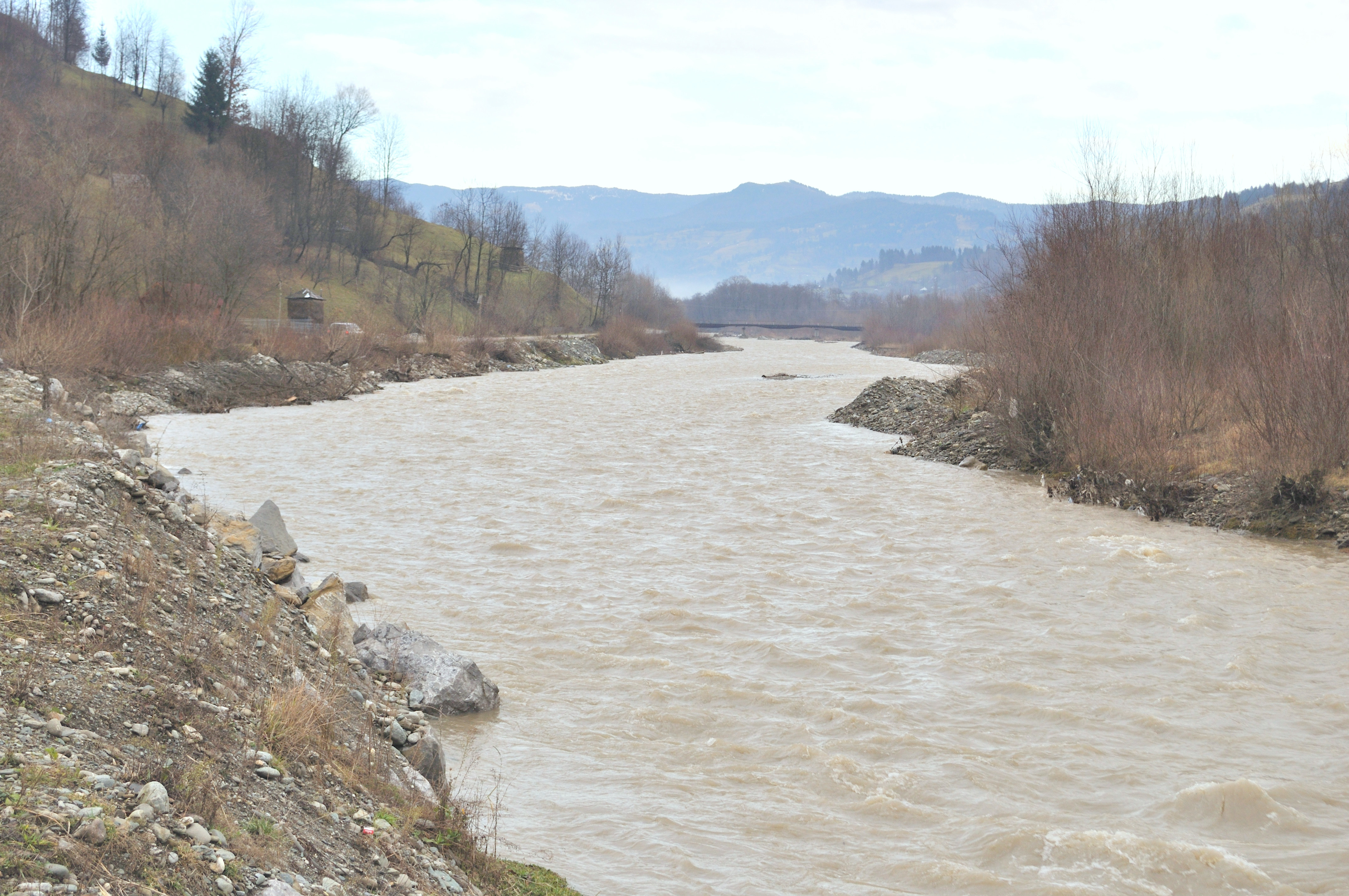
- The river Ruscova near Repedea

- Location within Romania

Location
- Country: Romania
- Counties: Maramureș County
- Villages: Poienile de sub Munte, Repedea, Ruscova

Physical characteristics
- Mouth: Vișeu
  - location: Leordina
  - coordinates: 47.7832°N 24.2713°E
- Length: 38 km (24 mi)
- Basin size: 433 km^{2} (167 sq mi)

Basin features
- Progression: Vișeu→ Tisza→ Danube→ Black Sea
- Tributaries
  - right: Socolău, Repedea

The Ruscova is a right tributary of the river Vișeu in Romania. It discharges into the Vișeu in the village Ruscova, near Leordina. Its length is 38 km (24 mi) and its basin size is 433 km^{2} (167 sq mi).

== Tributaries ==
The following rivers are tributaries to the river Ruscova:

- Left: Budescu, Lutoasa, Bardi, Cvașnița, Drahmirov
- Right: Socolău, Paulic, Pentaia, Repedea
