= Ristea Priboi =

Romanian intelligence agent and politician

Member of the Chamber of Deputies of Romania
- In office 2000–2004
- Constituency: Vrancea County

Personal details
- Born: May 9, 1947 (age 78) Brădești, Dolj County, Romania
- Citizenship: Romanian
- Party: Social Democratic Party (PSD)
- Spouse: Mariana Priboi
- Children: 2
- Education: Securitate School (Băneasa, 1968); Law degree (1971)
- Occupation: Intelligence agent, politician
- Known for: Officer in Securitate and SIE; Involvement in Radio Free Europe operations; Oversight of Yugoslav Wars fuel smuggling; Advisor to Adrian Năstase.

Ristea Priboi (born May 9, 1947) is a Romanian intelligence agent and politician. A member of the Social Democratic Party (PSD), he was a member of the Romanian Chamber of Deputies for Vrancea County from 2000 to 2004.

== Biography ==
Born in Brădești, Dolj County, in 1968 he graduated from the school of the Communist regime's Securitate secret police in Băneasa, also obtaining a law degree in 1971. In 1970, he was appointed as an officer in the Securitate's Department of Foreign Intelligence (DIE). His espionage missions included the United Kingdom (1974–1978), Sweden, France, Spain, Norway, Denmark, Belgium, the Netherlands, and Greece. After the 1989 revolution that toppled the regime, he continued his work in the Foreign Intelligence Service (SIE), with his last assignment being to the Federal Republic of Yugoslavia. There, he assured friendly relations between the Romanian government of President Ion Iliescu and that of Serbian President Slobodan Milošević. He contributed to the organisation of fuel smuggling to Serbia, infringing upon the embargo established by United Nations Security Council Resolution 713 as a result of the Yugoslav Wars. Romanian authorities carried out the smuggling in 1995 with the help of the secret services and of private companies controlled by former Securitate officers. He formally retired in 1997.

While in the Securitate, one of Priboi's roles was as deputy to General Nicolae Pleșiță, chief of the DIE department responsible for Radio Free Europe (RFE). During this time, the department coordinated a 1981 bomb attack on the RFE headquarters, perpetrated by Carlos the Jackal, as well as attempts to assassinate RFE employees and the dissident writer Paul Goma. According to investigations by historian Marius Oprea, Priboi also conducted political police activities inside Romania. Oprea asserts he was involved in the 1981 actions of the Securitate against a large group of intellectuals—the Transcendental Meditation affair. He also places him at the repression of the Brașov Rebellion of 1987, citing two witnesses who claim they were investigated by him, including one (Werner Sommerauer) who accuses him of participation in acts of torture.

In 1994, Priboi became an adviser on issues of national security for Adrian Năstase, whose hunting partner, mentor, and godfather to one of his sons he was, and who was the Chamber's president (1992–1996) and vice president (1996–2000) before becoming Prime Minister in 2000. Priboi was himself elected to the Chamber in 2000 as a deputy from Vrancea County, taking an oath that he had never collaborated with the Securitate, saying he had only been "employed" by the agency. While there, he sat on the committee for defence, public order and national security, and on the joint committee providing oversight to the activities of Serviciul Român de Informații. He became president of this committee in February 2001, which led to public revelations of Priboi's Securitate past. The press, civil society, and part of the political opposition criticised him, while Năstase (who had backed Priboi's ascension to the position) and Iliescu came to his defence, with the latter maintaining that he should not be blamed for having been a Securitate employee. His position seemed at odds with Romania's aspiration to join NATO, with one opposition senator, Radu F. Alexandru of the National Liberal Party (PNL), labelling it "a provocation and a lack of responsibility". Priboi resigned in April, although he remained on the committee and continued as one of Năstase's closest confidants. In November 2002, the committee cleared Priboi of involvement in internal Securitate activities and specifically the Brașov Rebellion, finding he had been engaged "exclusively" in foreign intelligence. At the same time, Oprea and fellow historian Adrian Cioroianu stated they had evidence he had been involved, respectively, at Brașov and in the Transcendental Meditation affair, prompting Priboi to announce he would sue them. He did file a defamation lawsuit against Oprea and Werner Sommerauer, the Brașov worker who accused Priboi of torture, but lost in court. The CNSAS, an institution charged with investigating Securitate affiliations, also investigated Priboi in March 2001, finding he did not engage in "activities of political police", prompting protest from member Mircea Dinescu, who opined that his monitoring of RFE met the "political police" designation.

Unofficial sources cited by the România Liberă newspaper claim that Priboi continued his intelligence work even while in the Chamber, and although numerous complaints were issued against him, no charges were allowed to proceed until the PSD lost the 2004 election. In February 2006, facing formal accusations of influence peddling and bribery on behalf of businessman Genică Boerică, and thought to have assisted in the criminal activities of Omar Hayssam, he fled the country. The charges in the Boerică case were dropped in 2007, as prosecutors could not determine with certainty that he had received bribes or abused his political position. He continued to be investigated for giving and accepting bribes in a case that also involved Năstase, and did not make a public appearance in Romania until March 2008. The case was sent to be tried in October 2009, but was suspended after the Constitutional Court intervened. As of 2010, Priboi was a consultant at the Bucharest branch of the Bulgarian energy company Obedineni Energiini Targovtsi (OET).

Priboi and his wife Mariana have two children. They live in the Cotroceni neighborhood of Bucharest.
