= Dan Ioan Popescu =

Romanian businessman and politician

Dan Ioan Popescu (Romanian pronunciation: [ˈdan iˈo̯am poˈpesku]; born March 10, 1948, in Ploieşti) is a Romanian businessman and politician. A chemical engineer, he served between 2001 and 2003 as Minister of Industry and between 2003 and 2004 as Minister of Economy, both in the Adrian Năstase cabinet. He is married and has one child.

== Biography ==
He spent his childhood and teenage years in his home town, Ploieşti, completing primary education at General School no.8 and General School no.11, and graduating the Mihai Viteazul High School. From 1966 to 1971 he studied at the Faculty of Industrial Chemistry of the Polytechnic Institute in Bucharest. Developing a solid interest in academic work, he earned his Ph.D. in chemical engineering in 1981, with a thesis on Phosphorus Nitrate Chlorides.

While working on his Ph.D. thesis, he attended the courses of the Policy and Management University (1977–1980). From 1985 to 1989 he continued his studies at Ştefan Gheorghiu Academy. Between 1977 and 1985 he was a visiting professor at the Faculty of Industrial Chemistry.

== Academic activity ==
Starting from the period of his research for the Ph.D. thesis and throughout the 1990s, Dan Ioan Popescu authored and published more than 60 papers in speciality journals in Romania and abroad. He is also the author of more than 30 patents in the field of chemistry and of more than 30 communications and speeches in this field, many of them being presented in international meetings.

=== Articles and specialty surveys (excerpt) ===
- 1977 – "Anti-sliding products based on silicon dioxide, used in the textile industry"
- 1978 – "Inorganic polymers based on N-P applicable in the textile industry"
- 1980 – "Synthesis of 4-3 Hydroxyethyl Aniline and of two reactive derivatives of dyes"
- 1980 – "IR spectrophotometry of certain phosphagen and phosphasine intermediates"
- 1980 – "Synthesis of certain acid dyes with dibenzo ( f,l), isoquinoline (2,3-b), quinazoline 5-10- dionic structure"
- 1980 – "Rheological behaviour of "agglutinant paste" and its influence in the printing process"
- 1981 – "Synthesis of dispersed dyes with heterocycloketonic structures for synthetic fibres"
- 1981 – " Hydroxipropylic starch based on agglutinants for the printing process"
- 1981 – "Synthesis of 2,4 diaminoacetanilide and dyes based on acids"
- 1983 – "Synthesis of dispersed dye for polyester fibers starting from 3,5 dichloroantranilic acid"
- 1983 – "Dibromoantranilic acid and some derivatives of dyes"
- 1983 – "Synthesis of 4- chloracetanilide and of certain cationic derivatives of dyes"
- 1983 – "Synthesis of 2- methyl-1,8- naphthopyrimidine, raw material for the synthesis of cationic nitric dyes"
- 1984 – "Theoretical aspects regarding the lubricating process and the adequate chemical products"
- 1985 – "Research works regarding the synthesis of certain dyes based on 2-chloro-5 methyl-1,4 phenylendiamine"
- 1985 – "Rheological study of agglutinate pastes APO-3"
- 1985 – "Compounds based on polyalkylethers and fatty acids with textile auxiliary effects"
- 1986 – "New contributions of the Textile Research Institute brought in the field of synthesis of chemical additives and the production for the textile industry"
- 1986 – "Agglutinants based on chemically modified starch"
- 1986 – "Chemical products for the protection of the textiles made of 100% wool against moths"
- 1986 – "Contributions of the Textile Research Institute to the research and production of chemical additives"
- 1992 – "Synthesis and application of certain anthraquinonic dyes"
- 1995 – "Synthesis and application of certain pyrasolonesulphonamidic dyes"

=== Patents (excerpt) ===
He is the author of the following patents:

- 1979 – "Process for obtaining a product based on modified starch for the textile printing pastes"
- 1981 – "Process for obtaining a washable adhesive for the textile industry"
- 1982 – "Process of preparing an agglutinant"
- 1983 – "Process for obtaining the starch acetate"
- 1985 – "Oiling product for the textile fibers and its obtaining process"
- 1985 – "Process for the treatment of viscose fibers"
- 1985 – "Process for the treatment of the materials made of 100% synthetic fibers"
- 1985 – "Synergic composition for the washing of raw wool"
- 1986 – "Agent for the treatment of polyester and the process of its obtaining"
- 1986 – Agent pentru tratarea poliesterului și procedeu pentru obținerea acestuia.

=== Books ===
- "Elements de chemie industrielle inorganique" – Authors: Prof.dr.eng.Eugen Pincovschi; Dr.eng. Dan Ioan Popescu; Publishing house: ARS DOCENDI - year 2004
- "Romania- The environment and the electric network of transport" - Geographic book; Publishing house: ACADEMIEI - year 2002 (Dan Ioan Popescu was a member of the Committee of Coordination of the book)
- "Romania- The soil quality and the electric network of transport" - Geographic book; Publishing house: ACADEMIEI - year 2004 (Dan Ioan Popescu was a member of the Committee of Coordination of the book)
- "Strategy of sustainable development in a society based on knowledge" Authors: Dr.eng. Dan Ioan Popescu, Prof. Aurelia Meghea, Prof.dr.eng. Eugen Pincovschi

== Professional activity and experience ==
After he graduated the courses of the Faculty of Industrial Chemistry, Dan Ioan Popescu remained in the County of Prahova where he worked first as an engineer for the Production Company Valea Călugărească (1971–1972), then as an engineer at the Institute for Research and Process Engineering in Petrochemistry and Refinery of Ploieşti (1972–1973).

In 1973, after having earned the degree of scientific researcher, he was appointed Chief of the laboratory "Synthesis of auxiliary chemical products" at the Textile Research Institute - Bucharest, holding this position for 11 years and passing through all the hierarchical levels up to that of Senior Researcher I. The fall of communism found him holding the position of Inspector with the Coordination Council of the Economic Activity, set up by the Council of Ministers. He worked for this body for four years.

Between 1990 and 1993 he was the General Manager of the Textile Research Institute and afterwards was appointed as Secretary of State within the Ministry of Industry (1994–1995).

In 1996, he was appointed Minister of Commerce.

In the period when his party (the Party of Social Democracy in Romania - PDSR) was in opposition, respectively 1996–2000, he was a Deputy and also the President of the Commission for Industries and Service within the Chamber of Deputies.

The peak of his public/political career was reached in the governing period of the Social Democrat Party (the renamed PDSR). Respecting the organizational structure of the Government led by Adrian Năstase, between 2000 and 2004 he served as Minister of Industry and Resources, State Minister and Minister of Economy and Commerce.

In 2005–2006 he returned to the function of President of the Commission for Industries and Service within the Chamber of Deputies, ending his mandate of Deputy in 2008.

Starting with 2009, he gave up all the public functions and re-entered the realm of business, serving as President of Administration Councils and the General Manager of different companies.

The Romanian High Court of Justice (Curtea de Casatie si Justitie) stated that 4.000.000 lei belonging to the Popescu family can not be legally traced, starting the process of confiscating the amount. In October 2007, the seizure had been lifted and the case closed. In 2015 the case was opened again in court, but the amount that could not be justified was reduced to 890.000 lei, considerably less than the initial trial in 2007. The case was definitively and irrevocably closed in 2015.

== Political activity ==
The Romanian political scene following the fall of Nicolae Ceauşescu's communist regime in December 1989 was dominated by an explosion of political structures of most diverse orientations, all engaging in an effervescent national debate regarding the future of the country. At the beginning of this post-1989 period, Dan Ioan Popescu was one of the founders of the Republican Party, holding the function of prime vice-president of this party for two years, between 1991 and 1993. In 1993 the Republican Party merged with the Party of Social Democracy in Romania (PDSR), whose unofficial leader was the President of Romania, Ion Iliescu.

Between 1995 and 2004, he was a key player in the internal strife within the party, and he became the vice-president of PDSR (party which later turned into PSD) as well as the President of the PSD Bucharest Organization.

In 2004, PSD made an alliance with the Humanist Party of Romania (renamed later as the Conservative Party). In the autumn of 2004, the two parties lost the elections to the Justice and Truth Alliance.

In opposition at that time, Dan Ioan Popescu decided to become a member of the Conservative Party and in 2006 he was elected its prime-vice-president.

== Affiliations to professional and nongovernmental organizations ==
- 1991–1998 : Vice-president of RENAR ( the Romanian Association for Accreditation - an institution that accredits the laboratories for trials and analysis in metrology, inspection bodies, bodies for certification of products, bodies for certification of personnel and bodies for certification of management systems for environment and quality, according to the European and international standards in force )
- 1995–2000: Vice-president of the Administration Council of the Chamber of Commerce and Industry of Romania
- 1997–2001: President of the General Union of the Industrialists of Romania - UGIR-1903
- 2005 - to present: President of the foundation "The Club of the Industrialists of Romania"

== Membership in bilateral structures ==
In the period 2000–2004, as Minister of Economy and Commerce, Dan Ioan Popescu co-chaired a series of intergovernmental commissions for economic cooperation:

- Co-president of the Romanian - Chinese Intergovernmental Bilateral Commission for commercial and economic cooperation
- Co-president of the Romanian -Thai Intergovernmental Bilateral Commission for commercial and economic cooperation
- Co-president of the Romanian - German Council for economic cooperation
- Co-president of Romanian - Egyptian the Intergovernmental Bilateral Committee for economic and technical cooperation
- Co-president of the Romanian - Iranian Bilateral Commission
- Co-president of the Romanian - Russian Intergovernmental Commission
- Co-president of the Romanian - Indian Intergovernmental Committee for economic, technical and scientific cooperation
- Co-president of the Romanian - Turkish Intergovernmental Commission
- Co-president of the Romanian- Syrian Intergovernmental Commission

== Honors, awards and decorations ==
- Honorary Citizen of City of Oradea - Romania
- Honorary Citizen of Houston – USA
- The medal "The Scientific Award" - Romania
- The medal for Economy "Baden-Württemberg" (2004)
- The Order "Star of Romania", Knight rank (2003)
- The Gold Decoration of the Austrian Republic (2004)
