= Socolău =

- Location within Romania

Location
- Country: Romania
- Counties: Maramureș County

Physical characteristics
- Source: Maramureș Mountains
- Mouth: Ruscova
  - coordinates: 47.8564°N 24.5140°E
- Length: 14 km (8.7 mi)
- Basin size: 72 km^{2} (28 sq mi)

Basin features
- Progression: Ruscova→ Vișeu→ Tisza→ Danube→ Black Sea
- Tributaries
  - right: Roșușul Mic

The Socolău is a right tributary of the river Ruscova in Romania. Its largest tributary is the Roșușul Mic. It discharges into the Ruscova near Poienile de sub Munte. Its length is 14 km (8.7 mi) and its basin size is 72 km^{2} (28 sq mi).
