= Poienile de sub Munte =

Commune in Maramureș County, Romania

Poienile de sub Munte Русь Поляни
- Commune
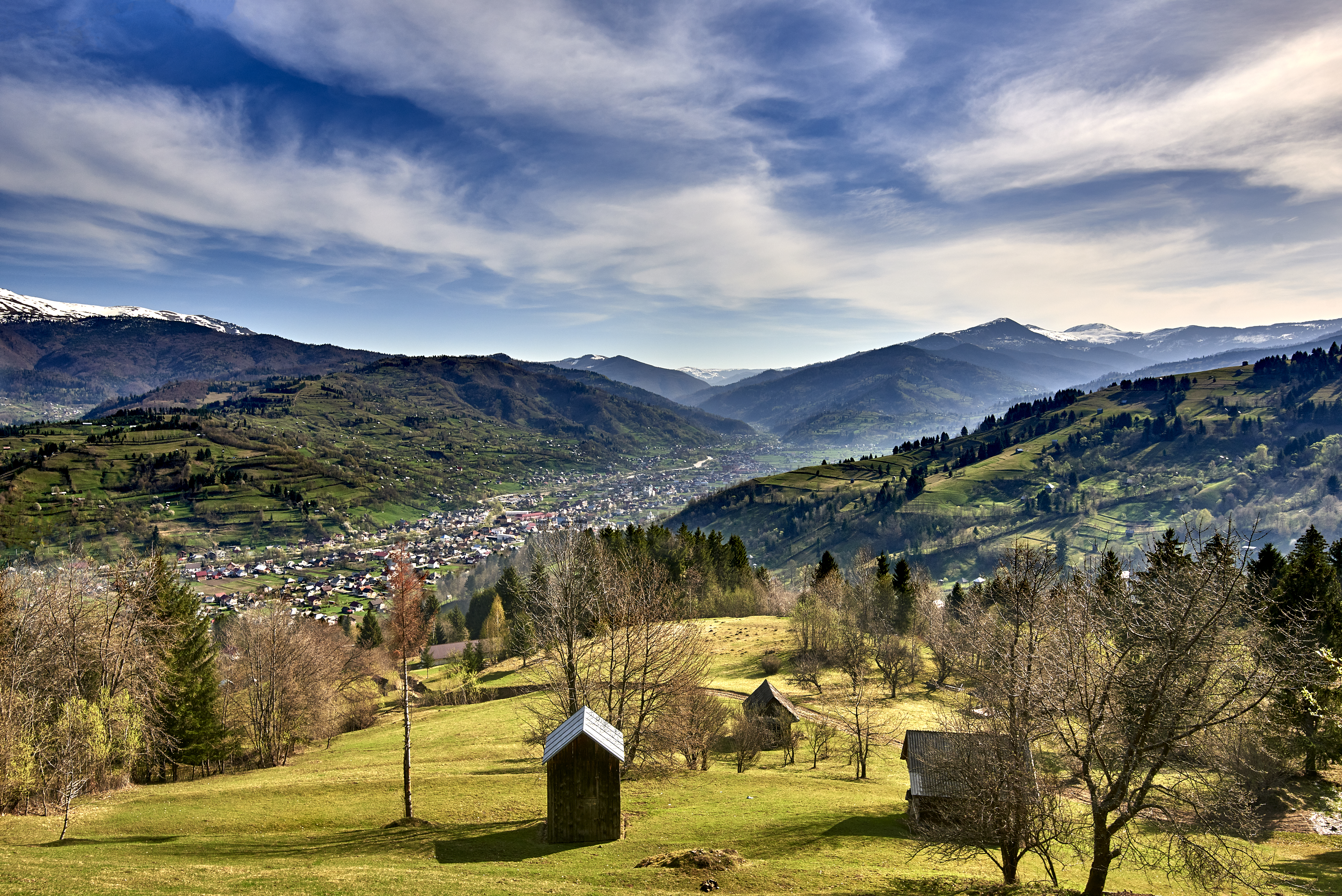
- Poenile de sub Munte from nearby massif in northeast

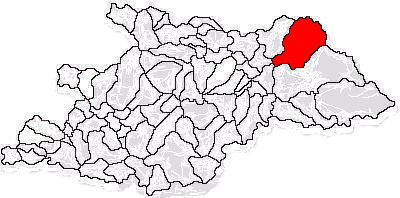
- Location in Maramureș County

- Location in Romania
- Coordinates: 47°49′N 24°26′E
- Country: Romania
- County: Maramureș
- Established: 1353 (first attested)

Government
  - Mayor (2020–2024): Alexa Chifa (USR)
- Area: 293.36 km^{2} (113.27 sq mi)
- Elevation: 530 m (1,740 ft)
- Highest elevation: 1,957 m (6,421 ft)
- Population (2021-12-01): 9,291
  - Density: 31.67/km^{2} (82.03/sq mi)
- Time zone: UTC+02:00 (EET)
  - Summer (DST): UTC+03:00 (EEST)
- Postal code: 437220
- Area code: (+40) 02 62
- Vehicle reg.: MM
- Website: www.poieniledesubmunte.ro

Poienile de sub Munte (Ukrainian: Русь Поляни, Поляни or Полонина; Rusyn: Русь Поляни; Hungarian: Ruszpolyána or Havasmező; Polish: Ruska Polana; German: Reußenau; Yiddish: פאליען-ריסקווה, romanized: Polien Riskeve) is a commune in Maramureș County, Maramureș, Romania. It is one of the oldest places in Maramureș, being mentioned for the first time in 1353. It is the biggest commune in the county and is composed of a single village, Poienile de sub Munte.

== Geography ==
The commune is located in the northeastern part of Maramureș County, on the border with Ukraine, 60 km (37 mi) east of the city of Sighetu Marmației and 105 km (65 mi) northeast of the county seat, Baia Mare. It is situated at an altitude of 530 m (1,740 ft), nestled within the Maramureș Mountains, with an altitude of 1,957 m (6,421 ft) being reached at Farcău Peak. The Maramureș Mountains Natural Park is partly located on the territory of the commune. The river Ruscova and its tributaries, the rivers Socolău and Cvașnița, flow through Poienile de sub Munte.

Obcina is a Ruthenian hilltop settlement perched at about 1,000 m (3,300 ft) on a mountain pass without an access road, where farmers live without machines, electricity, or vehicles.

== Etymology ==
Etymology of the name of the locality: from Poiana (< subst. poiana "light in the forest", of Slavic origin) + de + sub + Munte (< appellative mountain < lat. mons, -tis). Literally, The Meadows under the Mountain.

== Demographics ==
Historical population
Year	Pop.	±%
1880	3,674	—
1900	4,807	+30.8%
1910	5,226	+8.7%
1930	5,644	+8.0%
1956	6,298	+11.6%
1977	8,776	+39.3%
1992	10,561	+20.3%
2002	10,033	−5.0%
2011	10,073	+0.4%
2021	9,291	−7.8%
Source: Census data

At the 2021 census, the commune had a population of 9,291, of which 90.83% were Ukrainians and 1.54% ethnic Romanians.

== Natives ==
- Ioan Dzițac (1953 – 2021), mathematician and computer scientist
