= Octav Cozmâncă =

Romanian politician (born 1947)

Octav Cozmâncă (Romanian pronunciation: [okˈtav kozˈmɨŋkə]; born 22 September 1947) is a Romanian politician. A former member of the Social Democratic Party (PSD), he was a member of the Romanian Senate for Botoșani County from 1996 to 2008. In the Adrian Năstase cabinet, he was Minister of Public Administration from 2000 to 2003.

== Biography ==
Born in Talpa village, now in Cândești Commune, Botoșani County, Cozmâncă graduated from the Law Faculty of the University of Bucharest in 1971. In 1960, he joined the ranks of the Union of Communist Youth (UTC) and in 1969 he became a member of the Romanian Communist Party (PCR). In 1980, he joined the central committee of the UTC. From 1983 to 1989, he was head coordinator at the general secretariat of the Romanian government. From 1989 to 1990, a period that spanned the fall of the Communist regime, he was an inspector for the government. From 1990 to 1992, working at the Culture Ministry, he directed the management of the trust for administering the national cultural patrimony. From 1992 to 1996, he was a secretary of state, heading the Department of Local Public Administration.

Elected to the Senate in 1996, he sat on various committees there: budget, finance, banking and capital markets (1996–2000); public administration, territorial organisation and environmental protection (1996–2000; 2004–2005); foreign policy (2003–2004); joint committee providing oversight to the activities of the Romanian Intelligence Service (2004–2008). He was Public Administration Minister from December 2000 to June 2003. Within his party, which he joined in 1992, he has been secretary of the national council (1993–1997), member of the executive central bureau (1996–2005), executive secretary (1997–2003) and executive president (2003–2005). Following criticisms of the party that he issued, the PSD removed him as a member in 2009. In 2011, together with other former members of the Romanian Communist Party, he was among the initiators of a new left-wing formation, the Party of Social Justice.

He and his wife, who died in 2005, had one child.
