= Acsinte Gaspar =

Romanian judge and politician (1937–2025)

Judge of the Constitutional Court of Romania
- In office 14 June 2004 – 2013

Member of the Chamber of Deputies of Romania for Vâlcea County
- In office 27 November 1996 – 14 June 2004

Personal details
- Born: 19 November 1937; Liteni, Baia County, Romania
- Died: 3 June 2025 (aged 87)
- Political party: PSD
- Education: University of Bucharest
- Occupation: Judge

Acsinte Gaspar (19 November 1937 – 3 June 2025) was a Romanian judge and politician. A member of the Social Democratic Party, he served in the Chamber of Deputies from 1996 to 2004 and was a judge of the Constitutional Court from 2004 to 2013.

Gaspar died on 3 June 2025, at the age of 87.
