= Climăuți =

- Village
- Location within Moldova
- Coordinates: 48.3108333333°N 27.6075°E
- Country: Moldova
- District: Dondușeni District

Government
  - Mayor: Mariana Chiriac (PDM)

Population (2014 census)
  - Total: 1,033
- Time zone: UTC+2 (EET)
  - Summer (DST): UTC+3 (EEST)

Climăuți is a village in Dondușeni District, Moldova.
