= Repedea =

- Commune
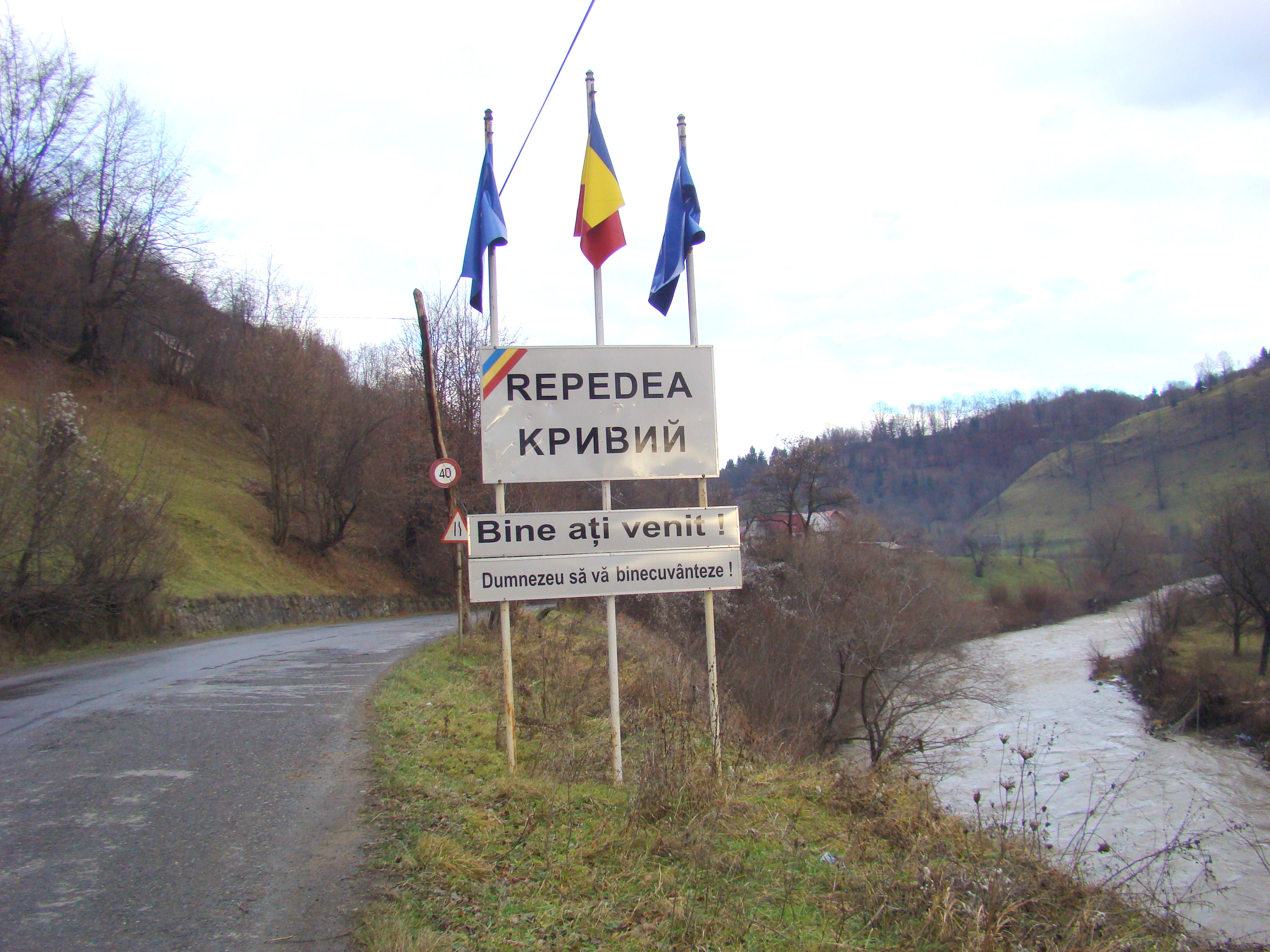
- Entrance sign to the commune

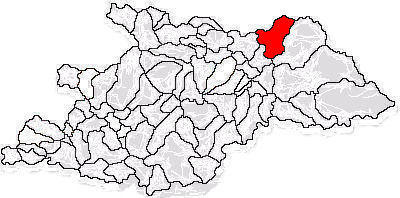
- Location in Maramureș County

- Location in Romania
- Coordinates: 47°50′N 24°24′E
- Country: Romania
- County: Maramureș

Government
  - Mayor (2024–2028): Ioan Miculaiciuc (PSD)
- Area: 113.7 km^{2} (43.9 sq mi)
- Elevation: 508 m (1,667 ft)
- Highest elevation: 1,957 m (6,421 ft)
- Population (2021-12-01): 4,679
  - Density: 41.15/km^{2} (106.6/sq mi)
- Time zone: UTC+02:00 (EET)
  - Summer (DST): UTC+03:00 (EEST)
- Postal code: 437240
- Area code: +(40) 262
- Vehicle reg.: MM
- Website: comunarepedea.ro

Repedea (Hungarian: Oroszkő, Ukrainian: Кривий, Rusyn: Кривий, Yiddish: קריווה, romanized: Krivei) is a commune in Maramureș County, Maramureș, Romania. It is composed of a single village, Repedea.

The commune is located in the northern part of Maramureș County, 100 km (62 mi) northwest of the county seat, Baia Mare, on the border with Ukraine. Repedea is situated in the Maramureș Mountains Natural Park, on the banks of the river Ruscova and its right tributary, Repedea. It is dominated by Farcău Peak; with an altitude of 1,957 m (6,421 ft), this is the highest point in the Maramureș Mountains.

== Demographics ==
Historical population
Year	Pop.	±%
1880	1,236	—
1900	1,593	+28.9%
1910	1,789	+12.3%
1930	1,743	−2.6%
1956	2,877	+65.1%
1977	4,074	+41.6%
1992	4,853	+19.1%
2002	4,761	−1.9%
2011	4,716	−0.9%
2021	4,679	−0.8%
Source: Census data

At the 2011 census, the commune had 4,716 inhabitants; of those, 96.7% were Ukrainians, 2.2% Romanians, and 0.3% Roma. At the 2002 census, 63.6% were Ukrainian Orthodox, 31.3% Pentecostal, 3.3% Seventh-day Adventist, and 0.9% Reformed. At the 2021 census, Repedea had a population of 4,679, of which 88.72% were Ukrainians and 2.67% Romanians.
