= Cândești, Botoșani =

Cândești
- Commune
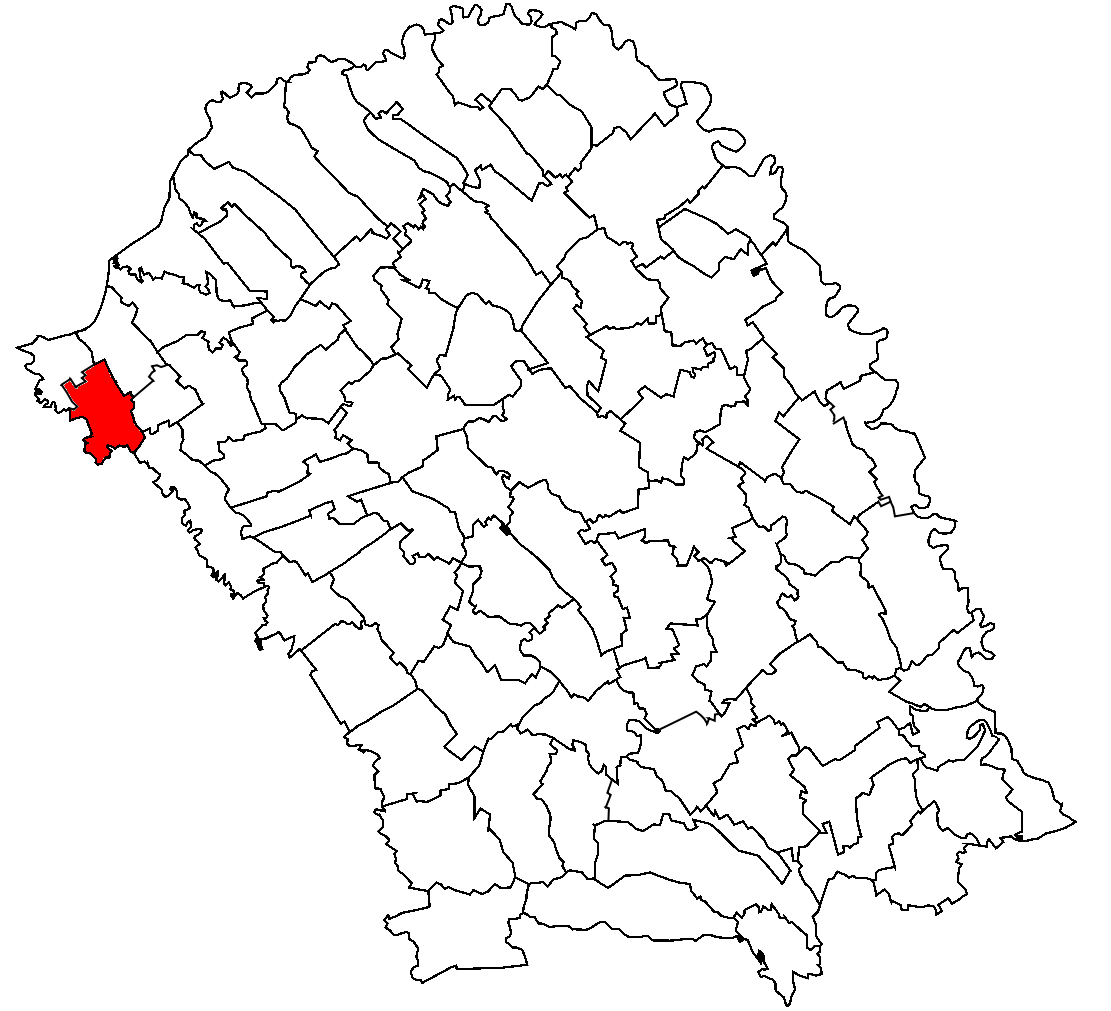
- Location in Botoșani County

- Location in Romania
- Coordinates: 47°55′30″N 26°11′0″E
- Country: Romania
- County: Botoșani
- Subdivisions: Cândești, Călinești, Talpa, Vițcani

Government
  - Mayor (2024–2028): Ștefan Coțofrec (PSD)
- Area: 42.35 km^{2} (16.35 sq mi)
- Population (2021-12-01): 1,920
  - Density: 45.3/km^{2} (117/sq mi)
- Time zone: EET/EEST (UTC+2/+3)
- Postal code: 717262
- Area code: +40 x31
- Vehicle reg.: BT
- Website: candestibt.ro

Cândești is a commune in Botoșani County, Romania. It is composed of four villages: Călinești, Cândești, Talpa, and Vițcani.

Cândești village is located in Bukovina, while the other three are in Western Moldavia.

== Natives ==
- Octav Cozmâncă
- Elisabeta Lipă
