= Ruscova =

Ruscova Ryskoвa
- Commune
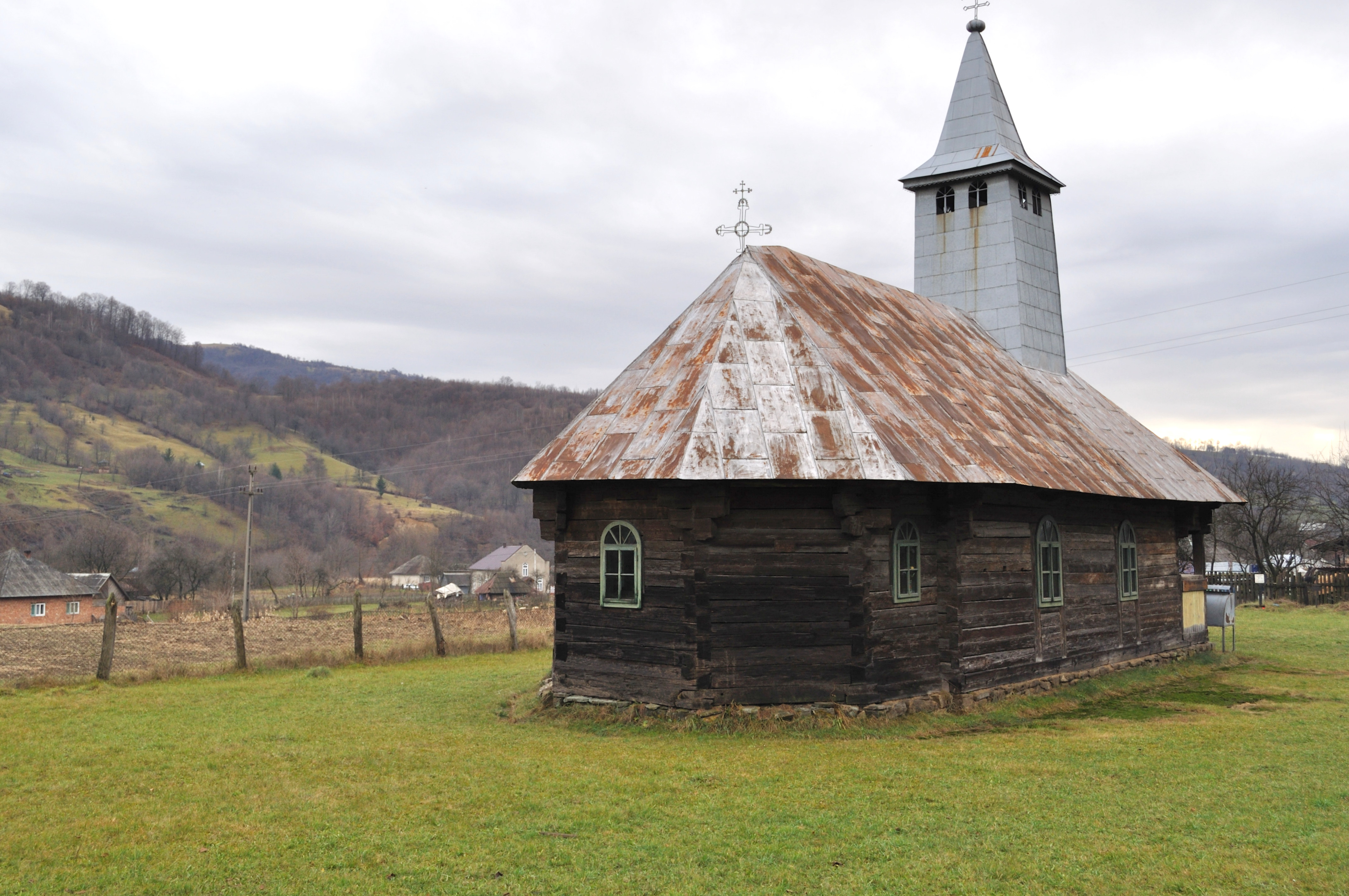
- Wooden church in Ruscova

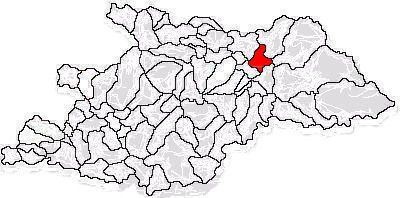
- Location in Maramureș County

- Location in Romania
- Coordinates: 47°48′N 24°17′E
- Country: Romania
- County: Maramureș

Government
  - Mayor (2020–2024): Ioan Turcsin (PNL)
- Area: 40.99 km^{2} (15.83 sq mi)
- Elevation: 418 m (1,371 ft)
- Population (2021-12-01): 5,373
  - Density: 131.1/km^{2} (339.5/sq mi)
- Time zone: UTC+02:00 (EET)
  - Summer (DST): UTC+03:00 (EEST)
- Postal code: 437260
- Area code: +(40) 262
- Vehicle reg.: MM
- Website: primariaruscova.ro

Ruscova (Hungarian: Ruszkova or Visóoroszi, Ukrainian: Рускова, Rusyn: Русково, Yiddish: ריסקווה, romanized: Riskeve) is a commune in Maramureș County, Maramureș, Romania. It is composed of a single village, Ruscova.

== Geography ==
The commune is situated in the western foothills of the Maramureș Mountains, at an altitude of 418 m (1,371 ft), within the Maramureș Mountains Natural Park. It lies on the banks of the river Ruscova, which flows into the river Vișeu at the western edge of the commune, in Leordina.

Ruscova is located in the northeastern part of Maramureș County, 20 km (12 mi) northwest of the town of Vișeu de Sus and 84 km (52 mi) northeast of the county seat, Baia Mare.

== History ==
The first written mention of the village dates back to 1373 (poss. Orosviz).

The village was part of Máramaros County in the Kingdom of Hungary. After the collapse of Austria-Hungary at the end of World War I and the declaration of the Union of Transylvania with Romania, the Romanian Army took control of the area in the spring of 1919, during the Hungarian–Romanian War. The village officially became part of the Kingdom of Romania in June 1920 under the terms of the Treaty of Trianon, which ceded the territory from Hungary. During the interwar period, the commune fell within plasa Vișeu of Maramureș County. In August 1940, the Second Vienna Award reassigned the territory of Northern Transylvania (which included Ruscova) from Romania to Hungary. Towards the end of World War II, however, the locality was taken back from Hungarian and German troops by Romanian and Soviet forces in October 1944.

In 1950, after Communist Romania was established, Ruscova became part of the Vișeu Raion of Baia Mare Region, renamed Maramureș Region in 1960. In 1968, the region was abolished, and since then, the commune has been part of Maramureș County.

== Demographics ==
Historical population
Year	Pop.	±%
1880	1,676	—
1900	2,409	+43.7%
1910	2,861	+18.8%
1930	3,158	+10.4%
1956	3,164	+0.2%
1977	4,324	+36.7%
1992	5,183	+19.9%
2002	4,854	−6.3%
2011	5,541	+14.2%
2021	5,373	−3.0%
Source: Census data

According to the census carried out in 2021, the population of Ruscova commune amounts to 5,373 inhabitants, down from the previous census in 2011, when 5,541 inhabitants were registered. The majority of the inhabitants are Ukrainians (84.68%), with Romanian (6.48%) and Roma (3.2%) minorities, and for 5.51% the ethnicity is unknown. From a confessional point of view, the majority of the inhabitants are Orthodox (78.63%), with minorities of Pentecostals (12.6%) and Adventists (2.03%), and for 5.58% their confessional affiliation is unknown.
