= Repedea (Ruscova) =

- Location within Romania

Location
- Country: Romania
- Counties: Maramureș County

Physical characteristics
- Mouth: Ruscova
  - location: Repedea
  - coordinates: 47.8313°N 24.3949°E
- Length: 19 km (12 mi)
- Basin size: 88 km^{2} (34 sq mi)

Basin features
- Progression: Ruscova→ Vișeu→ Tisza→ Danube→ Black Sea

The Repedea is a right tributary of the river Ruscova in Romania. It discharges into the Ruscova in the village Repedea. Its length is 19 km (12 mi) and its basin size is 88 km^{2} (34 sq mi).
