= Copăcele =

Copăcele Копечеле
- Commune
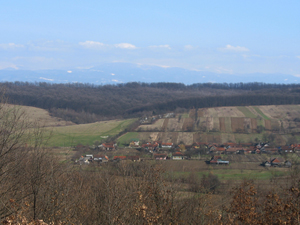

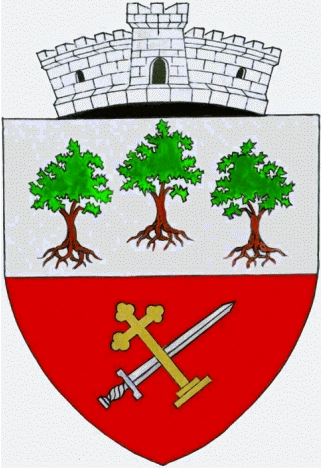
- Coat of arms

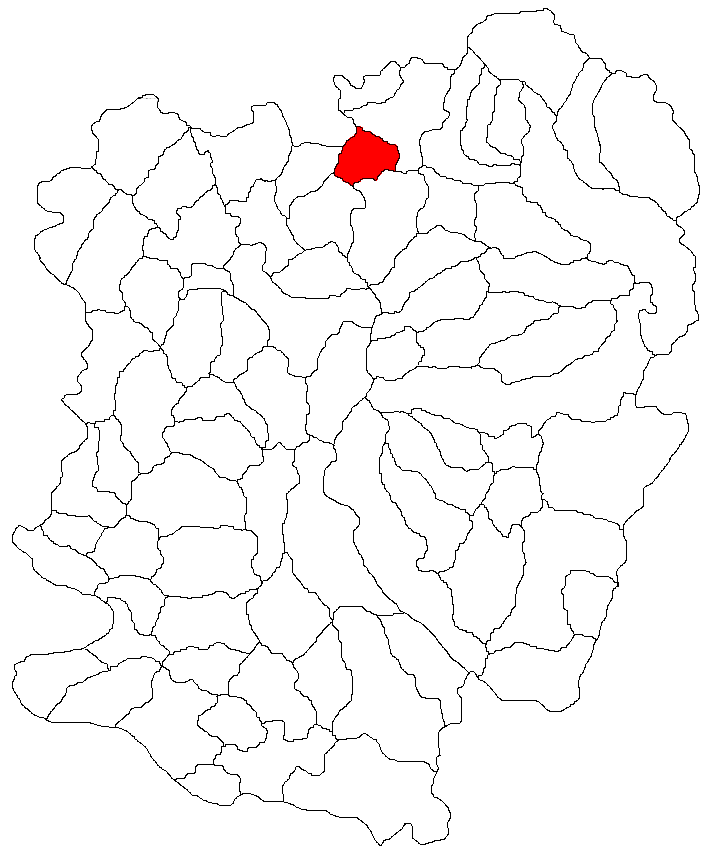
- Location in Caraș-Severin County

- Location in Romania
- Coordinates: 45°30′N 22°06′E
- Country: Romania
- County: Caraș-Severin

Government
  - Mayor (2024–2028): Ion-Ilie Hîrțaucă (PSD)
- Area: 51.12 km^{2} (19.74 sq mi)
- Elevation: 195 m (640 ft)
- Population (2021-12-01): 865
  - Density: 16.9/km^{2} (43.8/sq mi)
- Time zone: UTC+02:00 (EET)
  - Summer (DST): UTC+03:00 (EEST)
- Postal code: 327100
- Area code: +(40) 02 55
- Vehicle reg.: CS
- Website: primariacopacele.ro

Copăcele is a commune in Caraș-Severin County, western Romania with a population of 865 people as of 2021. It is composed of four villages: Copăcele, Ohaba-Mâtnic, Ruginosu, and Zorile. Copăcele is situated in the historical region of Banat.

In Romanian	In Hungarian	In Ukrainian
Copăcele	Ruténtelep	Копечеле
Ohaba-Mâtnic	Mutnokszabadja	Охаба-Митнік
Ruginosu	Rugyinóc	Руджиносу
Zorile	Zoltánfalva	Зоріле

Historical population
Year	Pop.	±%
1880	1,203	—
1910	1,494	+24.2%
1930	3,536	+136.7%
1977	2,310	−34.7%
2002	1,357	−41.3%
2011	1,111	−18.1%
2021	865	−22.1%
Source: Census data

At the 2011 census, the commune had 1,111 inhabitants; of those, 59.41% were Ukrainians and 36.9% Romanians. At the 2021 census, Copăcele had a population of 865, of which 50.75% were Ukrainians and 42.77% Romanians.
