= Eugen Bejinariu =

Romanian politician (born 1959)

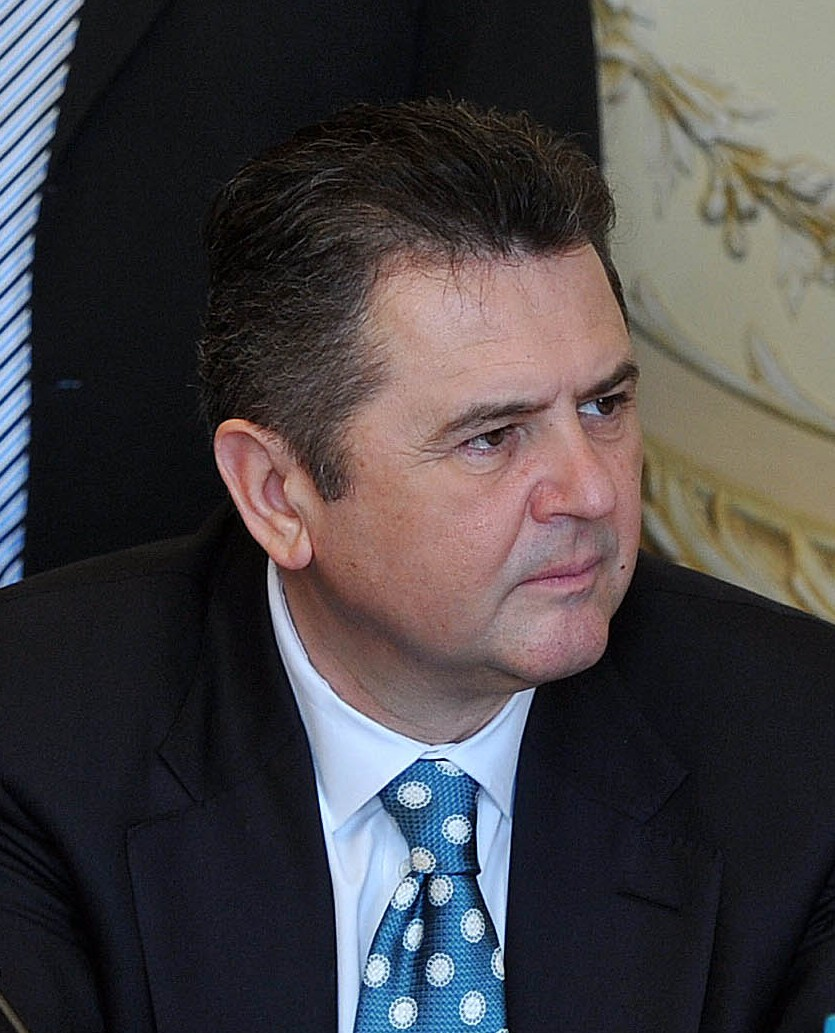
- Bejinariu in 2014

Prime Minister of Romania Acting
- In office 21 December 2004 – 28 December 2004
- President: Traian Băsescu
- Preceded by: Adrian Năstase
- Succeeded by: Călin Popescu-Tăriceanu

Personal details
- Born: 28 January 1959 (age 67) Suceava, Suceava County, Romania
- Party: Social Democratic Party (PSD)

Eugen Bejinariu (Note: Romanian pronunciation: [e.uˈdʒen beʒinaˈri.u]) (born 28 January 1959) is a Romanian politician and member of the Social Democratic Party (PSD). He served as acting/ad interim Prime Minister of Romania between 21 and 28 December 2004, when former PSD Prime Minister Adrian Năstase, who had just been defeated in the 2004 presidential elections by Traian Băsescu (then PD candidate supported by the Justice and Truth Alliance, or DA for short, which also comprised the PNL), resigned and became President of the Chamber of Deputies.

Bejinariu was appointed as acting/ad interim prime minister at the request of resigning PSD prime minister, Adrian Năstase, and confirmed by the new president Traian Băsescu to hold the office until a new prime minister was named (which subsequently was in the person of Călin Popescu-Tăriceanu of the PNL). Bejinariu was the minister of government coordination in Năstase's cabinet, joining the government after a long stint as chairman of Romania's State Protocol Department (RAPPS). He was replaced as prime minister on 28 December 2004 by national liberal Călin Popescu-Tăriceanu.

Political offices
Preceded by Adrian Năstase	Prime Minister of Romania; Acting; 2004	Succeeded by Călin Popescu-Tăriceanu
