= Brădești, Dolj =

Brădești
- Commune
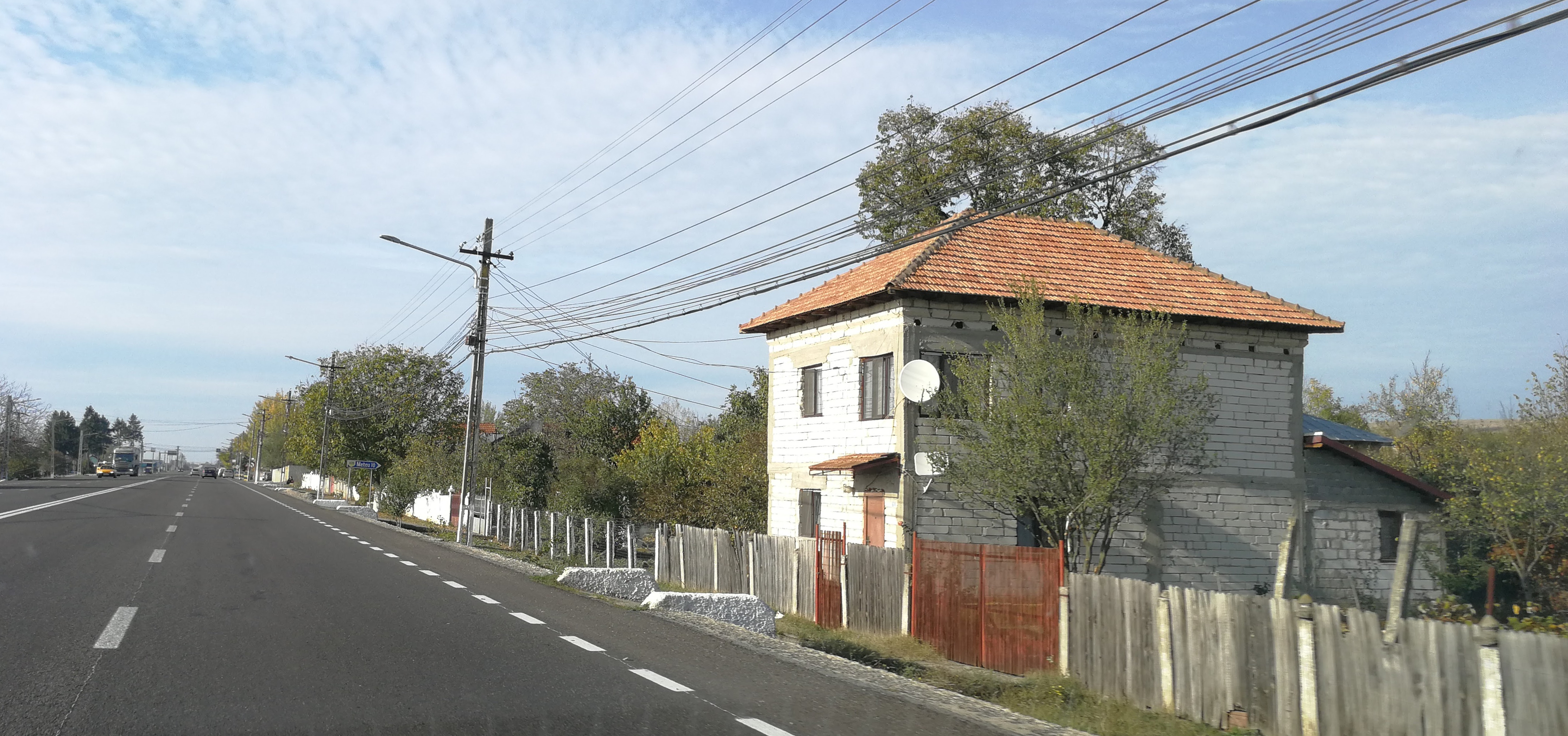
- National road DN65 in Brădești

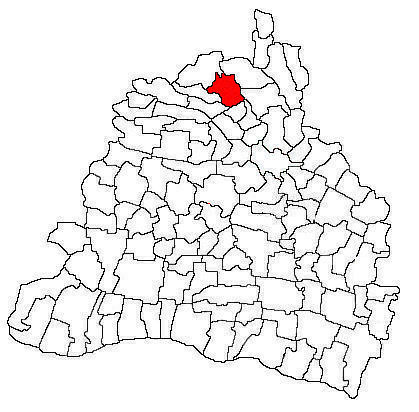
- Location in Dolj County

- Location in Romania
- Coordinates: 44°29′N 23°38′E
- Country: Romania
- County: Dolj
- Area: 63.06 km^{2} (24.35 sq mi)
- Elevation: 126 m (413 ft)
- Population (2021-12-01): 4,248
  - Density: 67.36/km^{2} (174.5/sq mi)
- Time zone: UTC+02:00 (EET)
  - Summer (DST): UTC+03:00 (EEST)
- Postal code: 207105
- Area code: +(40) 251
- Vehicle reg.: DJ
- Website: www.primariabradesti.ro

Brădești is a commune in Dolj County, Oltenia, Romania with a population of 4,248 as of 2021. It is composed of six villages: Brădești, Brădeștii Bătrâni, Meteu, Piscani, Răcari (Răcarii de Jos from 1968 to 2017), and Tatomirești.

The commune is located in the northern part of the county, 25 km (16 mi) from the county seat, Craiova.

== Natives ==
- Ristea Priboi (born 1947), intelligence agent and politician

== See also ==
- Castra of Răcarii de Jos
