= Aurel Vlaicu University of Arad =

University in Arad, Romania

Coordinates: 46°10′25.1″N 21°19′1.7″E

- Universitatea „Aurel Vlaicu" din Arad
- Motto: Together
- Type: Public
- Established: 1972/1990
- Rector: Teodor Cilan
- Academic staff: 215
- Students: 7,288 (2014–2015)
- Location: Arad, Romania
- Website: www.uav.ro

Aurel Vlaicu University of Arad is a public university founded in 1990 in Arad, Romania. It was named in honor of the Romanian engineer and aviation pioneer Aurel Vlaicu.

== Overview ==
Started in 1972, as the Arad Institute of Sub-Engineers, the institution was accredited on 18 May 1990 to grant university degrees. Over the years, Aurel Vlaicu University has developed new specializations, with new faculties, which meet the terms of quality standards. The 2009–10 academic year marks the establishment of the Faculty of Design and the specializations: psychology, computer science, economics, marketing, and fashion and fashion design. Thus at the beginning of academic year UAV has 9 departments, 38 specialties license, 19 master's programs, field IOSUD (Institution organizing PhD studies) in Philology, and 12 departments.

A fundamental dimension of higher education is the scientific research. In the 2008–09 academic year scientific research accelerated in comparison with previous years. In 2008 UAV participated in 9 international research projects and 7 national research projects. Of these, 8 international projects and 5 international projects won. The value of research contracts funded by the national competition was 2,027,202 RON and of the international projects was US$52,350."Rector’s speech to the opening of the academic year 2009-2010

== Faculties ==
1. Faculty of Design
2. Faculty of Economic Sciences
3. Faculty of Exact Sciences
4. Faculty of Humanities and Social Sciences
5. Faculty of Educational Sciences, Psychology and Social Sciences
6. Faculty of Theology
7. Faculty of Engineering
8. Faculty of Food Engineering, Tourism and Environmental Protection
9. Faculty of Physical Education and Sport
