= Mircea Beuran =

Romanian surgeon

Mircea Beuran (born June 5, 1953) is a Romanian surgeon and university professor. He was head of the department of surgery at Carol Davila University of Medicine and Pharmacy in Bucharest. From June to October 2003, he served as Health Minister in the Adrian Năstase cabinet. Between 2000 and 2003 he was State Councilor. He was director of the Surgery Clinic within the Emergency Hospital of Bucharest.

Presently, he is the First Vice-President of the Romanian Medicine Academy and a surgeon in the Sanador Hospitals Group.
