= Adrian Năstase =

Romanian politician

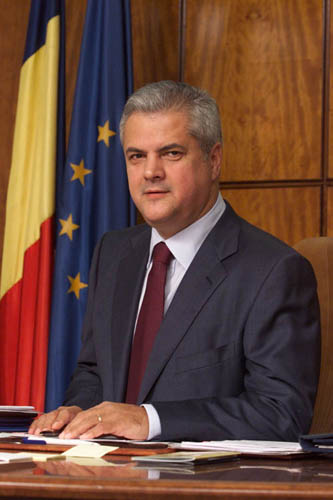
- Năstase in 2006

Prime Minister of Romania
- In office 28 December 2000 – 21 December 2004
- President: Ion Iliescu
- Preceded by: Mugur Isărescu
- Succeeded by: Eugen Bejinariu (Acting); Călin Popescu Tăriceanu

President of the Chamber of Deputies
- In office 21 December 2004 – 15 March 2006
- President: Traian Băsescu
- Preceded by: Valer Dorneanu
- Succeeded by: Bogdan Olteanu
- In office 1 March 1992 – 22 November 1996
- President: Ion Iliescu
- Preceded by: Dan Marțian
- Succeeded by: Ion Diaconescu

Minister of Foreign Affairs
- In office 28 June 1990 – 18 November 1992
- Prime Minister: Petre Roman; Theodor Stolojan
- Preceded by: Sergiu Celac
- Succeeded by: Teodor Meleșcanu

President of the Social Democratic Party
- In office 20 December 2000 – 21 January 2005
- Preceded by: Ion Iliescu
- Succeeded by: Mircea Geoană

Member of the Chamber of Deputies
- In office 18 June 1990 – 20 June 2012

Personal details
- Born: 22 June 1950 (age 76) Bucharest, Romanian People's Republic
- Party: Social Democratic Party (2001–present)
- Other political affiliations: Romanian Communist Party (Before 1989); National Salvation Front (1989–1992); Democratic Front of National Salvation (1992–1993); Party of Social Democracy in Romania (1993–2001)
- Spouse(s): Ilinca Preoteasa (Divorced); Dana Miculescu
- Education: University of Bucharest
- Profession: Lawyer
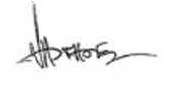
- Signature

Adrian Năstase (Note: Romanian pronunciation: [adriˈan nəsˈtase]) (born 22 June 1950) is a Romanian jurist, academic/professor, blogger, and former politician who served as the prime minister of Romania from December 2000 to December 2004.

He competed in the 2004 presidential election as the Social Democratic Party (PSD) candidate, but was defeated by the centre-right Justice and Truth Alliance (DA) candidate Traian Băsescu who pertained at that time to the Democratic Party (PD).

He was the president of the Chamber of Deputies from 21 December 2004 until 15 March 2006, when he resigned due to corruption charges. Sentenced to two years in prison in July 2012, he attempted suicide before beginning his term in the penitentiary. Released in March 2013, he was sentenced to four years in another case in January 2014, but released that August.

A controversial figure due to the corruption scandals in which he was involved, Năstase is still regarded by both admirers and rivals (including his archrival Traian Băsescu), as an efficient Romanian post-communist Prime Minister, being praised for his efforts of Euro-Atlantic integration of Romania and for the stabilization and modernization of the Romanian economy.

== Biography ==
=== Family background ===
Năstase was born in Bucharest to a family that originated from Hanul de Pământ village, Tărtășești commune, Dâmbovița County. His father, Marian Năstase, was an officer of the Royal Romanian Army. His mother is named Elena and he has a sister, Dana Barb (née Năstase).

=== Youth period ===
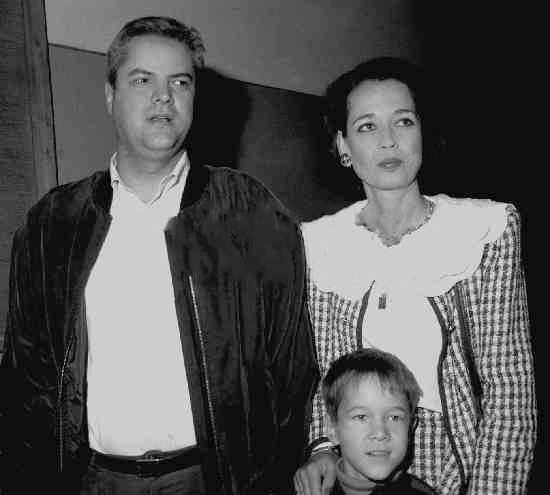
Năstase with his wife and son in 1992

Adrian Năstase finished high school at Nicolae Bălcescu High School (now Saint Sava National College) and then graduated from the University of Bucharest, receiving degrees from both the Department of Law and the Department of Sociology. He worked at various times as a professor, judge, and as president of several organizations involved with law and international relations.

On 31 July 1985, he married Dana Miculescu, the daughter of Angelo Miculescu. They have two sons, Andrei (b. 12 February 1986) and Mihnea (b. 23 June 1993).

=== Post-1989 political career ===
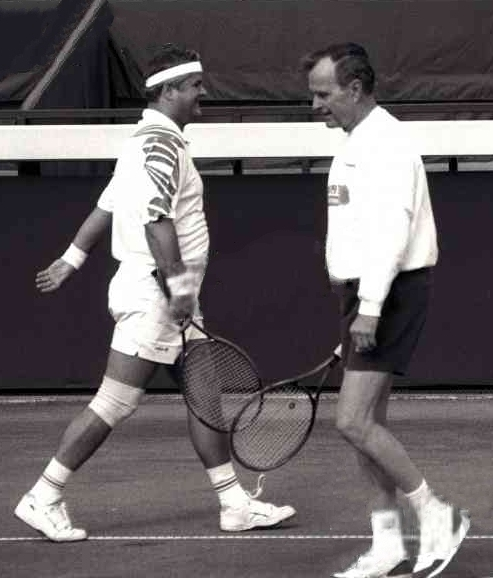
Năstase playing tennis with the former U.S. President George H. W. Bush in Bucharest in 1995

Năstase was first elected to the Chamber of Deputies of Romania as member of the National Salvation Front party on 9 June 1990 and served as the Minister of Foreign Affairs in the governments of Petre Roman and Theodor Stolojan (28 June 1990 – 16 October 1992).

In 1992, he was re-elected to the Chamber of Deputies as a member of the Democratic National Salvation Front (FDSN) and served as the president of the Chamber of Deputies. Between 1993 and 1997, he was also the executive president of the Party of Social Democracy in Romania (PDSR, formerly the FDSN).

When the PDSR lost the 1996 elections, Năstase became leader of the opposition PDSR parliamentary group, vice-president of Chamber of Deputies, and member of Standing Bureau and Member of the Romanian delegation to the Parliamentary Assembly of the Council of Europe where he was the Recording Secretary of Council of Europe commission on judicial problems and human rights with reference to illegal activities by religious sects.

After the victory of the PDSR in the 2000 legislative elections and the re-election of Ion Iliescu as president of Romania, Năstase was elected president of the PDSR, which soon changed its name to the Social Democratic Party (PSD) after merging with another party. Năstase remained PSD president until April 2005 when he was replaced by former foreign minister Mircea Geoană at a party congress. At the same congress, Năstase was elected to be PSD executive president, the second most senior position in the party.

=== Term as Prime Minister of Romania ===
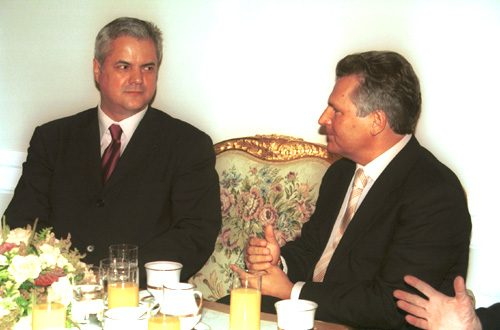
Adrian Năstase with Aleksander Kwaśniewski

Năstase was confirmed by the Parliament as prime minister on 28 December 2000, following his appointment to the position in days before by President Ion Iliescu. He held the position concurrently with his leadership of the PSD. His four years as prime minister were characterized by unprecedented political stability in post-communist Romania, continuous economic growth, and a foreign policy strongly oriented toward the West, although during 2001, the press and some of the political opposition questioned this in light of his close association with former Securitate agent Ristea Priboi. Romania joined NATO, and committed Romanian troops in support of international efforts in the Balkans, Afghanistan, and Iraq.

His government completed accession negotiations with the European Union (EU) and aggressively passed legislation and implemented a number of reforms required for EU accession, which was subsequently completed with the 2007 enlargement of the European Union. His government successfully negotiated the lifting of visa restrictions on Romanians traveling to EU Schengen treaty countries.

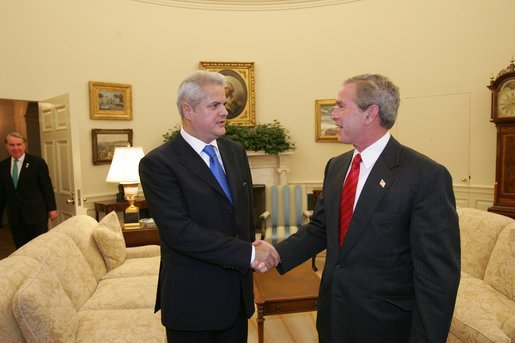
Adrian Năstase with George W. Bush

Inflation decreased and the Romanian leu became stronger. However, critics pointed out that this was at least partially due to an influx of foreign currency into Romania from the estimated two million Romanians working abroad. GDP also grew substantially during each year of his term, with a growth of 8.3% achieved in 2004, the highest in the region. Average wages similarly grew, although they did not match the pace of economic growth. For example, in 2004 wages grew by 10.4%, with a 9.2% inflation rate, thereby leading to a real wage growth of 1.2%, in a year when GDP grew by 7%.

The Năstase government did not make substantial inroads on a number of important issues in Romanian society, such as agricultural policy: about 42% of Romanians continued to work in agriculture (compared to 3% of French and 19% of Poles). Critics also pointed out that economic growth was not evenly distributed among the social classes, and the percentage of people living below the poverty level remained high, especially in the rural areas.

Although the government took initial steps toward meaningful judicial reform, the government was repeatedly criticized, including by the EU, for failing to combat substantially widespread corruption, including at the highest levels.

In 2002, Năstase was appointed a Grand Cross of the Order of the Star of Romania, which was revoked in December 2019 because of his double criminal indictment.

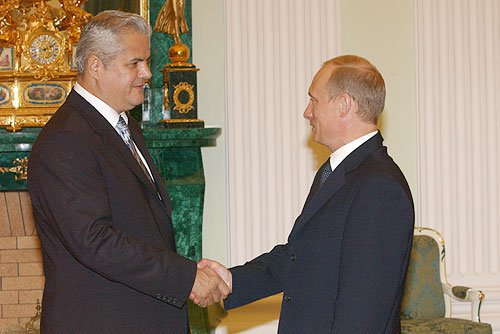
Adrian Năstase with the Russian President Vladimir Putin

=== 2004 presidential candidacy ===
The 2004 presidential election cycle marked the end of the second term of President Ion Iliescu, who, according to the constitution, could not serve another term. The PSD selected Năstase to be its presidential candidate. His running mate (selected to be prime minister in the event of a Năstase win) was then Foreign Minister Mircea Geoană.

Throughout the autumn of 2004, opinion polls predicted Năstase would win, boosted in areas and among sectors where the PSD traditionally received strong support: in rural areas, in small and medium-sized towns in the south and east of the country, and among pensioners and labor groups. The PSD, which remained by far the largest single political party in the country, was also expected to rely on its network of local party organizations to ensure voters came to the polls.

Năstase was ahead by a substantial margin during 28 November first round of the presidential elections, although he received less than 50 percent of the vote, and therefore was required to compete in a 12 December run-off election against second place center-right Justice and Truth Alliance (DA) candidate Traian Băsescu. Independent civil society organizations alleged incidents of fraud in Năstase's favor during the first round of the elections, including alleged multiple voting by PSD supporters as a result of poor controls on voter identification and flaws in the electronic vote tabulation.

At the time the polls closed on the evening of the run-off election, major media outlets released the results of exit polls showing a tie between Năstase and Băsescu. Nonetheless, Băsescu and his supporters interpreted the results as clear indication of a victory. Tens of thousands of Băsescu's supporters converged on University Square in the center of Bucharest, and in other parts of the country, to celebrate his presumed victory. The next morning, authorities released figures confirming Băsescu's win. Năstase received only 48.77% of the total vote.

Năstase later attributed his surprise defeat to a number of factors, including what he characterized as a failure of Humanist Party (PC) politicians to campaign on his behalf (the Humanist Party had an electoral pact with the PSD at that time); and the endorsement of Băsescu by Greater Romania Party (PRM) leader Corneliu Vadim Tudor. Other likely factors include Băsescu's strong performance during the second presidential debate, as well as persistent allegations of corruption against Năstase and the PSD.

Despite Năstase's presidential defeat, the PSD still won the largest bloc of seats in the Parliament in the concurrent legislative elections. Following the elections and in the interim period before Băsescu's DA Alliance was able to form a coalition majority, the PSD succeeded in obtaining sufficient support within the parliament to elect Năstase as president of the Chamber of Deputies. Former PSD Prime Minister Nicolae Văcăroiu was elected president of the Senate in the same circumstances. Năstase resigned as prime minister the day after Băsescu's inauguration. Later on, at the request of Cozmin Gușă, the campaign manager of Traian Băsescu, who resigned from Băsescu's party after he got elected, requested the release of the official results regarding the alleged fraud of the 2004 elections. The investigation concluded that there were no hard evidence of this fraud and that the elected president, Traian Băsescu, had no proofs to make that statement. The accusation of stealing the elections heavily helped Băsescu win the elections, some political analysts argue.

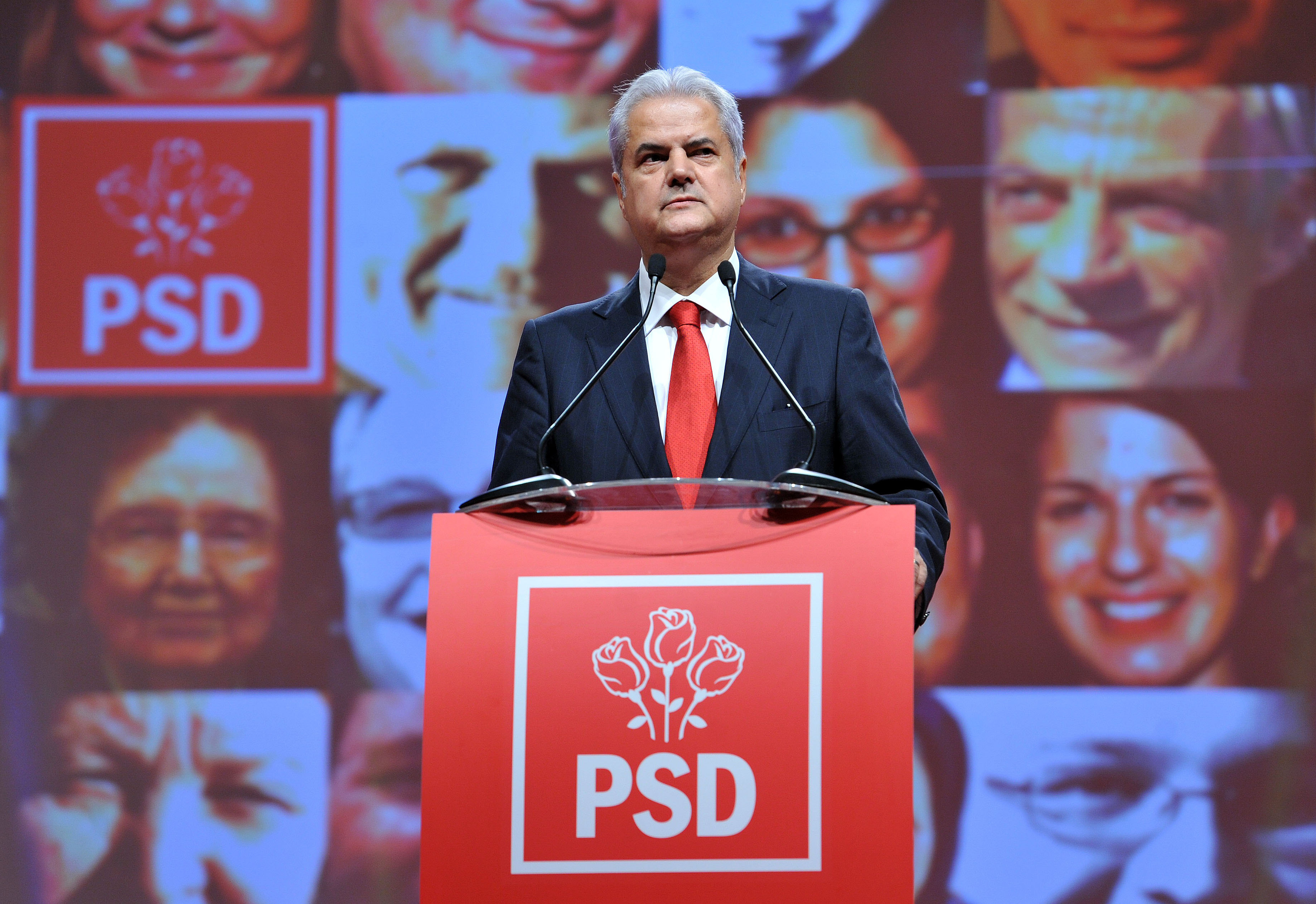
Adrian Nastase at PSD National Council (2013)

=== Corruption trial, sentence and attempted suicide ===
On 30 January 2012, the courts gave Năstase a two-year prison sentence for misuse of a publicly funded conference to raise cash for his unsuccessful campaign in 2004. Năstase claimed the sentence was influenced by rival politician Traian Băsescu, at the time President of Romania, and indicated that if necessary, he would take his case to the European Court of Human Rights. Responding to the allegations, Băsescu denied the charges were political in nature and claimed they stemmed from denunciations made by members of Năstase's party.

Adrian Năstase was convicted of corruption charges on 20 June 2012 and sentenced to a 2-year imprisonment term. At the time when the sentence was pronounced, he was the only head of government sentenced to prison in the 23 years following the Romanian Revolution.

When the police arrived at his home to arrest Năstase, he shot himself in the throat in an apparent suicide attempt and was taken to a hospital. Many people now believe that this apparent suicide was in fact a final botched attempt on his part to evade justice. On that night he was removed by ambulance with a Burberry scarf draped about his neck thus hiding any evidence of serious injury from gathered reporters. After receiving treatment during a six-day period, he was moved to Rahova prison and then transferred to Jilava prison on medical grounds, to be treated for his diabetes and heart condition.

In January 2014, the Romanian Supreme Court sentenced him to a four-year prison sentence for taking bribes and a three-year prison sentence for blackmail, to run concurrently. As a result, Năstase lost his status as a professor. He was eventually released later the same year, and in December 2021, 7 years later, the Romanian Supreme Court accepted Năstase's request for judicial rehabilitation with respect to the two sentences, after multiple prior attempts. If the decision remains final, Năstase will be once again able to exercise his right to vote and be elected to public office.

=== Post premiership ===
In recent years, Năstase advises officials regarding state affairs and international relations, including solving bilateral conflicts and strengthening diplomatic and economic ties between countries and organizations.

== Publications ==
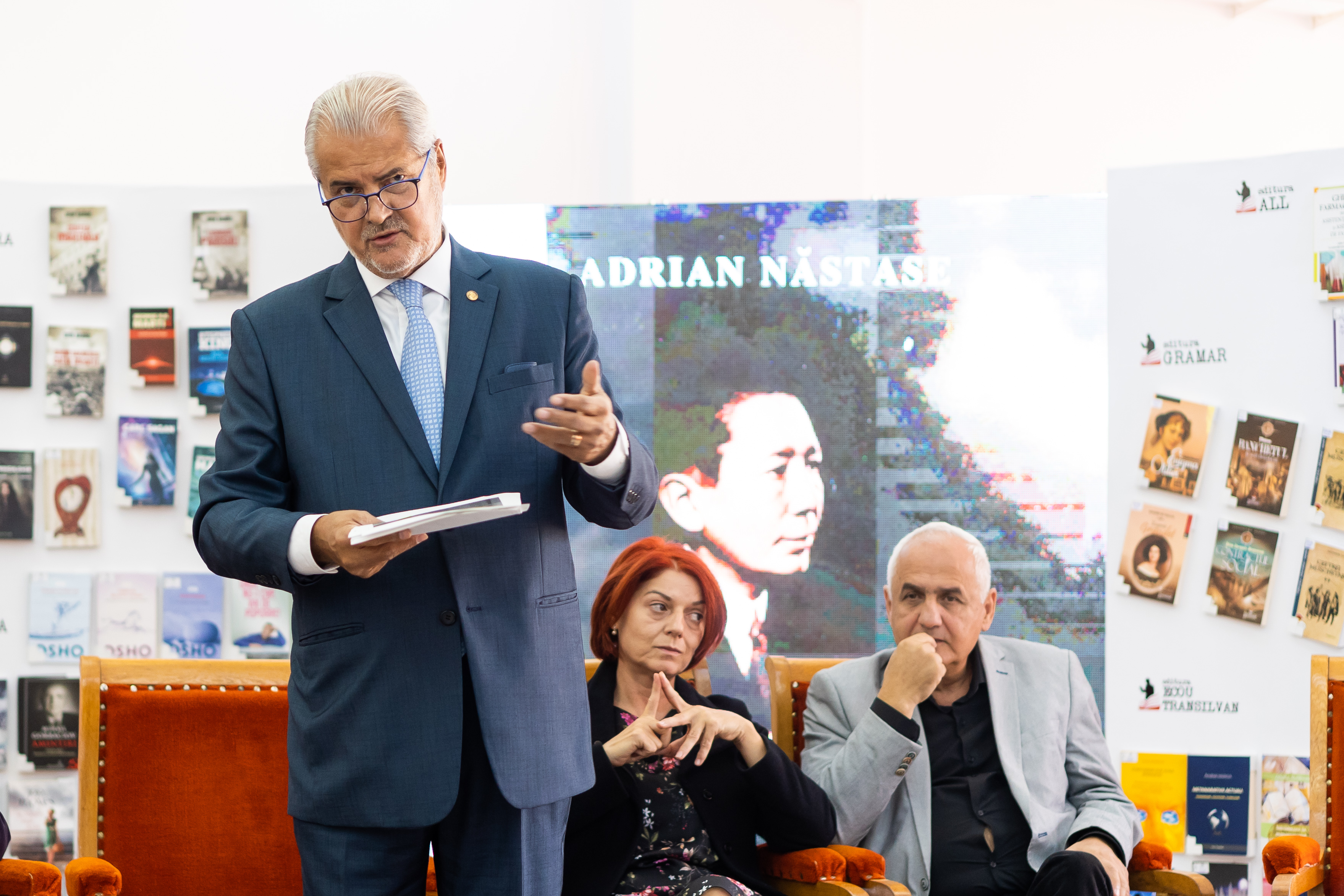
Năstase in 2018

Năstase has published over 150 pieces on International law in Romanian and foreign journals, and has held over 140 talks at international meetings; publications include:

- Human Rights: a Retrograde Concept
- The Political Idea of Change
- International Economic Law II
- Parliamentary Humor
- Romania and the New World Order
- The Construction of Europe and Constitutional Supremacy
- Romania's Treaties (1990–1997)
- Personal Rights of the National Minorities
- Regulations in International Law
- The Battle for Life
- Romania-NATO 2002
- NATO Enlargement.

=== Presidential elections ===
Election	Affiliation	First round			Second round		
Election	Affiliation	Votes	Percentage	Position	Votes	Percentage	Position
2004	National Union PSD+PUR	4,278,864	40.9%	1st	4,881,520	48.8%	2nd

== See also ==
- List of heads of government of Romania
- List of corruption scandals in Romania

== Notes ==
Political offices
Preceded by Sergiu Celac	Minister of Foreign Affairs; 1990–1992	Succeeded by Teodor Meleșcanu
Preceded by Dan Marțian	President of the Chamber of Deputies; 1992–1996	Succeeded by Ion Diaconescu
Preceded by Mugur Isărescu	Prime Minister of Romania; 2000–2004	Succeeded by Eugen Bejinariu; Acting
Preceded by Valer Dorneanu	President of the Chamber of Deputies; 2004–2006	Succeeded by Bogdan Olteanu
Party political offices
Preceded by Ion Iliescu	President of the Social Democratic Party; 2000–2004	Succeeded by Mircea Geoană
