= Leordina =

- Commune
- Leordina

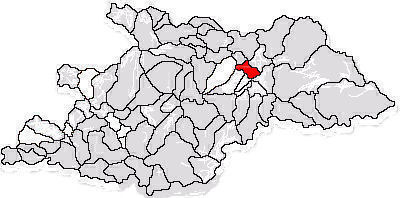
- Location in Maramureș County

- Location in Romania
- Coordinates: 47°47′13″N 24°14′49″E
- Country: Romania
- County: Maramureș

Government
  - Mayor (2020–2024): Ioan Nistor (USR)
- Area: 29.94 km^{2} (11.56 sq mi)
- Elevation: 420 m (1,380 ft)
- Population (2021-12-01): 2,307
  - Density: 77.05/km^{2} (199.6/sq mi)
- Time zone: UTC+02:00 (EET)
  - Summer (DST): UTC+03:00 (EEST)
- Postal code: 437180
- Area code: (+40) 02 62
- Vehicle reg.: MM
- Website: primaria-leordina.ro

Leordina (Yiddish: לרדינה, romanized: Lerdine) is a commune in Maramureș County, Maramureș, Romania. It is composed of a single village, Leordina.

== History and etymology ==
First documentary attestation: 1411 (Lewrgyna, Leorgina, Leurgyna, Leorgyna).

Etymology of the name of the locality: from anthrop. Leorda (< subst. leordă, var. of leurdă 'wild garlic', autochthonous word, cf. wh. hudhër, hudër 'garlic') + suff. -in + suf. top. -a.

== Geography ==
The commune is located in the northeastern part of Maramureș County, 38 km (24 mi) southeast of the city of Sighetu Marmației and 80 km (50 mi) northeast of the county seat, Baia Mare. The neighbouring localities are Petrova and Vișeu de Jos. It is situated at an altitude of 420 m (1,380 ft), in the western foothills of the Maramureș Mountains, on the banks of the river Vișeu.

Leordina is crossed by national road DN18 for about 4.5 km (2.8 mi); the road starts in Baia Mare, runs through Sighetu Marmației and Borșa, 40 km (25 mi) to the southeast, and ends in Iacobeni, Suceava. The Leordina train station serves the CFR Line 409, which starts in Salva, Bistrița-Năsăud, continues to Vișeu de Jos, and ends in Sighetu Marmației.

== Demographics ==
Historical population
| Year | Pop. | ±% |
|---|---|---|
| 1880 | 1,138 | — |
| 1900 | 1,451 | +27.5% |
| 1910 | 1,669 | +15.0% |
| 1930 | 2,197 | +31.6% |
| 1956 | 2,870 | +30.6% |
| 1977 | 2,814 | −2.0% |
| 1992 | 2,818 | +0.1% |
| 2002 | 2,593 | −8.0% |
| 2011 | 2,547 | −1.8% |
| 2021 | 2,307 | −9.4% |
Source: Census data

At the 2021 census, Leordina had a population of 2,307, with an absolute majority (95.5%) of ethnic Romanians.
