= Viseu (disambiguation) =

Viseu is a municipality in Portugal.

Viseu or Vișeu may also refer to:

- Vișeu, a tributary of the river Tisza in northern Romania
- Viseu, Pará, a municipality in Pará, Brazil
- Vișeu de Jos, a commune in Maramureș County, Romania
- Vișeu de Sus, a town in Maramureș County, Romania
- Viseu Airport, in Viseu, Portugal
- Viseu District, a district in the Northern and Centro regions of Portugal
- Viseu 2001, a sports club in Viseu, Portugal

== People ==
- Duke of Viseu, a Portuguese royal dukedom, including a list of people bearing the title
- Eleanor of Viseu (1458–1525), Portuguese infanta and later queen consort of Portugal
- Isabel of Viseu (1459–1521), daughter of Infante Fernando, Duke of Viseu, and Infanta Beatrice
