= Fantana =

Fantana may refer to:

Places in Romania: see Fântâna (disambiguation)

Other uses:

- USS Fantana (SP-71), a United States Navy patrol boat in commission from 1917 to 1919
- Fantanas, a group of spokesmodels for Fanta
- Fantana (musical), a 1905 musical by John Raymond Hubbell
- Brian Fantana, a character in the comedy films Anchorman: The Legend of Ron Burgundy and Anchorman 2: The Legend Continues, played by Paul Rudd
