= Repedea (Vișeu) =

- Location within Romania

Location
- Country: Romania
- Counties: Maramureș County

Physical characteristics
- Source: Rodna Mountains
- Mouth: Vișeu
  - coordinates: 47.6461°N 24.7097°E
- Length: 11 km (6.8 mi)
- Basin size: 42 km^{2} (16 sq mi)

Basin features
- Progression: Vișeu→ Tisza→ Danube→ Black Sea
- Tributaries
  - left: Buhăescu

The Repedea is a left tributary of the river Vișeu in Romania. It discharges into the Vișeu in Borșa. Its length is 11 km (6.8 mi) and its basin size is 42 km^{2} (16 sq mi).
