= Florin Spulber =

Florin Spulber is the Romanian national ski jumping coach and a former ski jumper. He holds the Romanian record in ski jumping with a jump of 118 metres uncertified by a qualified committee. He also holds the hill record in the K-110 at Borşa in Romania.
