= Bistra, Maramureș =

Bistra Бистрий
- Commune
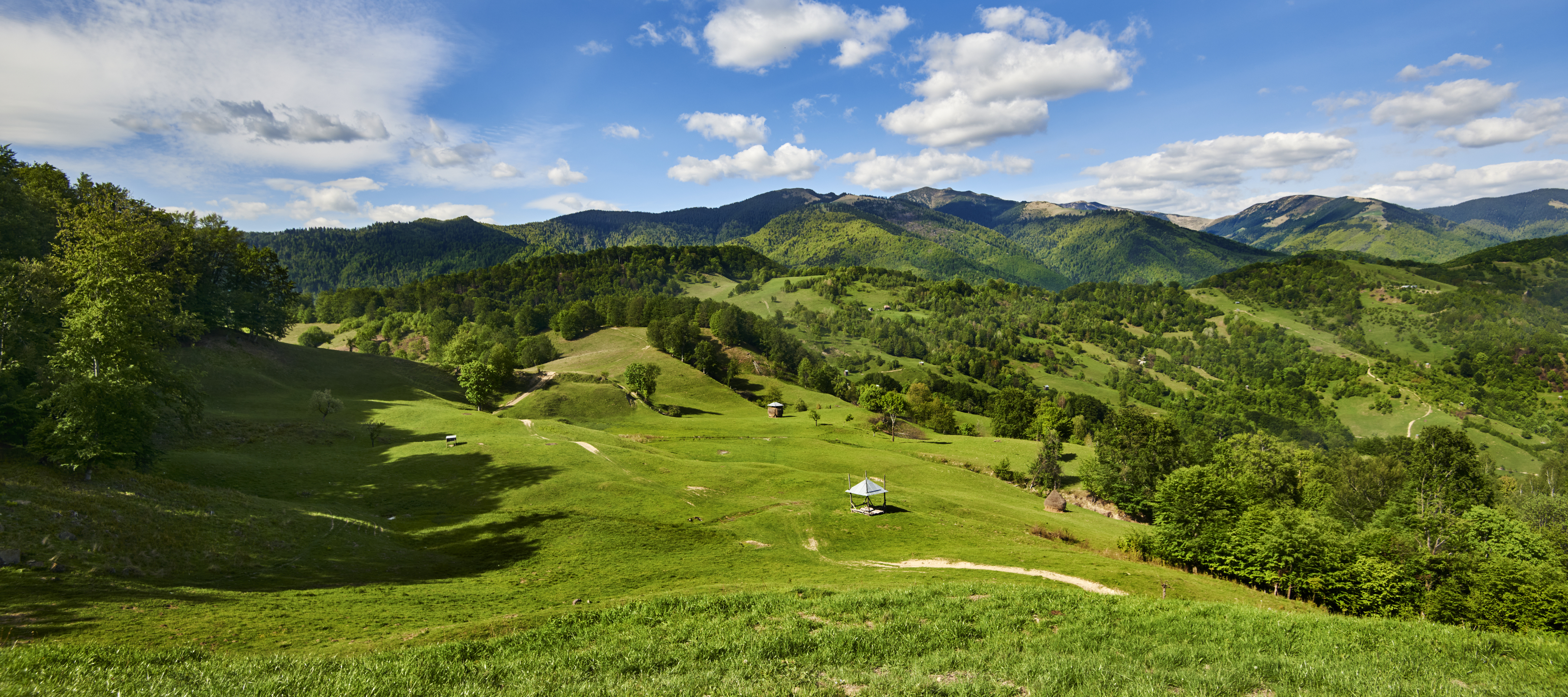
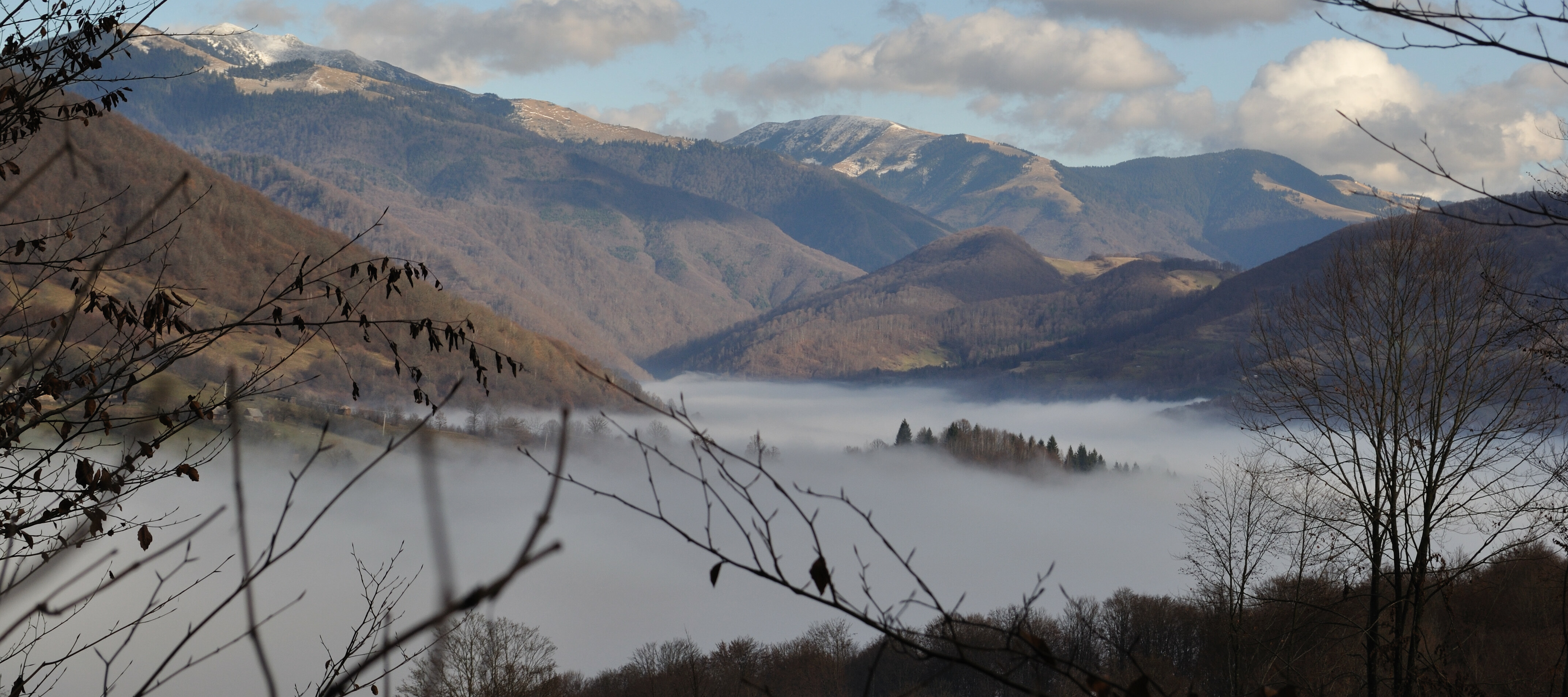
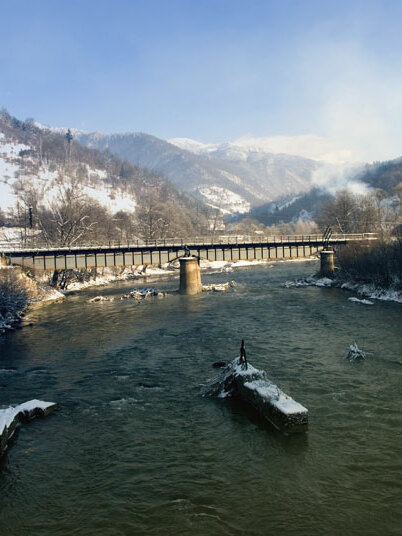
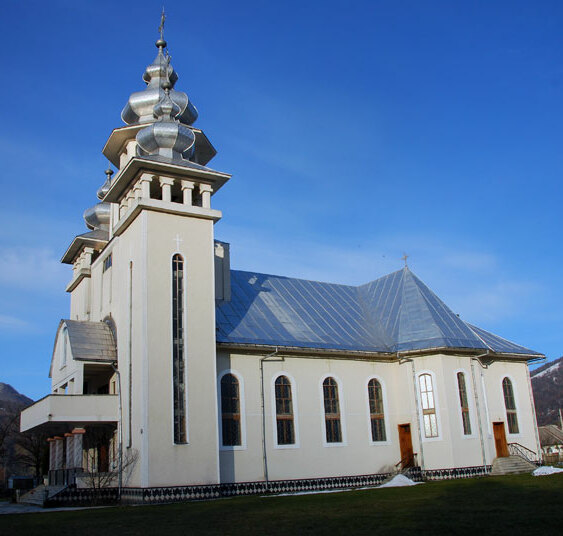
- From top, left to right: Crasna Vișeului village, Vișeu River near Bistra, Valea Vișeului Orthodox Church, Valea Vișeului village

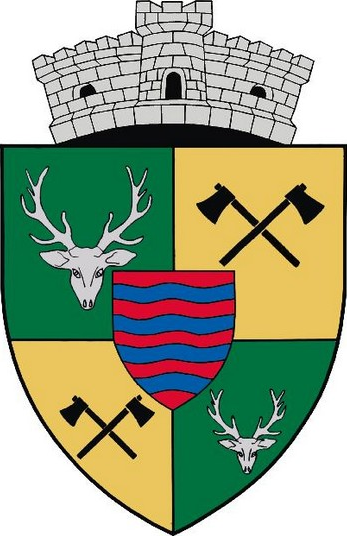
- Coat of arms

- Location in Maramureș County

- Location in Romania
- Coordinates: 47°51′50″N 24°11′30″E
- Country: Romania
- County: Maramureș
- Established: 1411
- Subdivisions: Bistra; Crasna Vișeului; Valea Vișeului

Government
  - Mayor (2020–2024): Vasile Duciuc (PNL)
- Area: 132.39 km^{2} (51.12 sq mi)
- Population (2021-12-01): 3,716
  - Density: 28.07/km^{2} (72.70/sq mi)
- Time zone: UTC+02:00 (EET)
  - Summer (DST): UTC+03:00 (EEST)
- Postal code: 437045
- Area code: (+40) 0262
- Vehicle reg.: MM
- Website: comunabistra.ro

Bistra (Romanian: Bisztra; Ukrainian: Бистрий, romanized: Bystryi; Rusyn: Быстрый; Hungarian: Petrovabisztra; Yiddish: ביסטרא, romanized: Bistro) is a commune in Maramureș County, Maramureș, Romania. The Ukrainian border is located to the north of the commune. It is made up of three villages: Bistra (commune seat), Crasna Vișeului (Hungarian: Petrovakraszna; Rusyn: Красна Вишовська), and Valea Vișeului (Hungarian: Visóvölgy; Ukrainian: Вишiвська Дοлина; Rusyn: Вишовська Долина). The first documentary mention of the settlement dates to 1411.

== Etymology and History ==
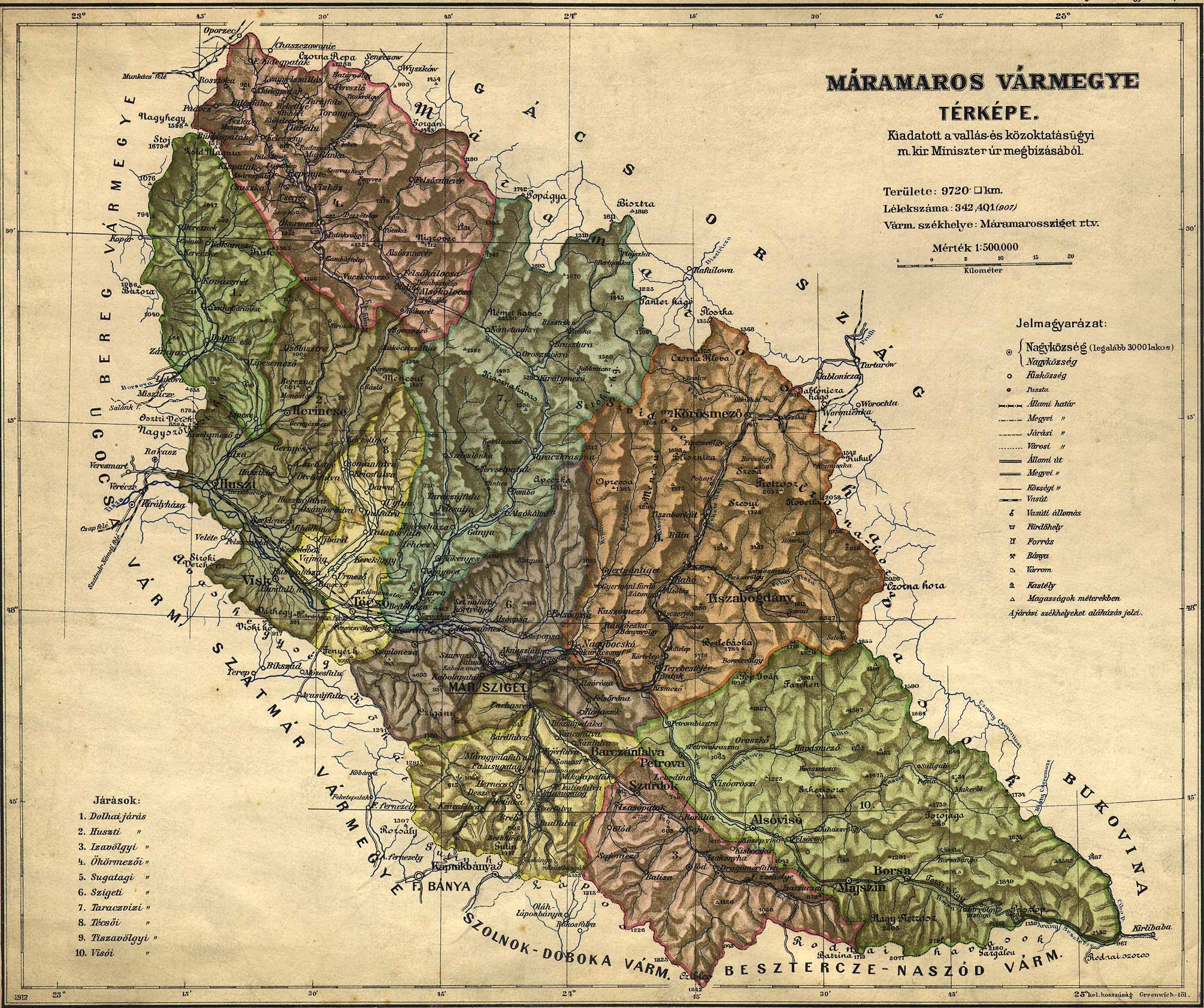
Map of Maramureș (Máramaros) Bistra village appears under the name Petrovabisztra

The name Bistra comes from the Valea Bistrei river, with its spring in the Hodea (Hovdea) mountain peak.

The first documented mention of the village's population was in 1882, with 550 people living there. By 1896, the population had grown to 661, out of which 470 were Greek Catholic, 38 Roman Catholic, and 153 Jews. In 1913, the village had a recorded population of 672, of which 511 were Ukrainians. The settlement continues to have a Ukrainian majority, the biggest demographic shift being the diminishing of the Jewish population.

The name Crasna Vișeului is believed to derive from the Ukrainian words for beautiful (krasnein, krasna, krasne), tied with the name of the river Crasna Frumușeaua. The river consists of two streams, one with its spring in Pop Ivan mountain Peak, and the other in Șerban-Topolev-Polonica Peak. The two merge, forming a fast flowing clear river, hence the name, which eventually flows into the Vișeu river. The first mention of Crasna Vișeului village dates back to 1411 in the "Diploma of Robert, King of Hungary", which called it the domain of the successors of Dragoș and Bogdan. According to documents of the time, the village bore the name of Frumosava in 1882. Between the XIV and XIX centuries the settlement belonged to the nearby village of Petrova. Between 1945 and 1968 the village was autonomous, but ever since 1968, Crasna Vișeului has been part of Bistra commune.

As a settlement, Valea Vișeului's existence has been documented since the beginning of the XV century. Its name derives from the Vișeu river and the word Valea (Valley in Romanian, Долина (r. Dolyna) in Ukrainian). Throughout its history, the village went through numerous name changes: Viso-Vișeu, Visovelidi, Valea-Vișeului, Fehei Potoc. Despite the lack of clear information, it is believed the original settlers in this area of the Tisza river bank were Hutsuls.

Early in their history, all three villages were assigned under Petrova, as the locals were likely the slaves (robi) of Petrovan nobles.

Between 1985 and 1989, a group of archeologists uncovered, in a place called Uloha, objects made of bronze that date back to the XI century. These objects are now in the custody of the Sighetu Marmației Museum of History and are the oldest records of human settlement in the area.

== Geography ==
Commune map

The commune has an area of 132.39 km^{2} (51.12 sq mi) and is mostly mountainous and forested. It is bordered by Ukraine to the north, Repedea commune to the east, Ruscova commune to the south-east, Petrova commune to the south-west, and Rona de Sus commune to the west.

=== Villages ===
==== Bistra ====
Despite having the smallest population of the three, Bistra village is the commune's administrative center. It is home to the commune's town hall and police department, and the Bistra I-VIII Grade School. The County Road DJ185 runs through the settlement, on the western part, near the bank of the Vișeu river.

==== Crasna Vișeului ====
Often shortened to Crasna, Crasna Vișeului village is located close to the bank of the Vișeu river, near the neighboring commune of Petrova. Because of its proximity to ethnically Romanian villages such as Petrova, the settlement is a mixed community, ethnically and linguistically. Young people are more likely to be bilingual.

==== Valea Vișeului ====
Valea Vișeului village is located in the north part of the commune. The Romania–Ukraine border is located north of the village. In the north-west of the village the river Vișeu joins the Tisza. The Vișeu also separates the village into two important areas: the main part of the village - on the right bank of the Vișeu - and Zaveschiva - on the left bank of the river.

=== Maramureș Mountains Natural Park ===
A majority of the commune's territory falls under the Maramureș Mountains Natural Park, the largest natural park in Romania. On the territory of Bistra commune, there are landmarks such as Polonica (Polonika) Peak and Bendivskei Cave.

== Economy ==
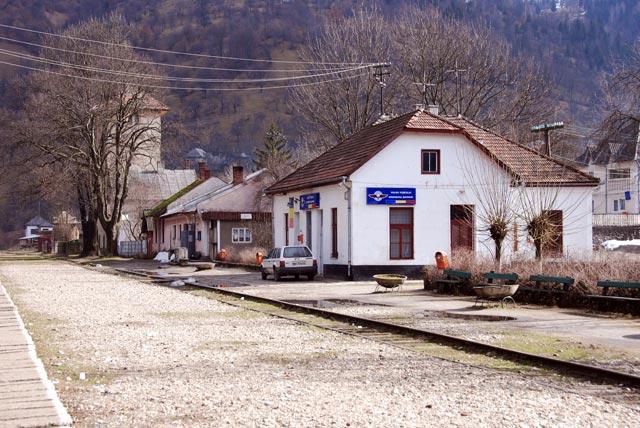
Railway station of Valea Vișeului

The main activity of the residents is subsistence farming, the main crops being potatoes, corn, oat, beans, onions, carrots, parsley, garlic, and cucumbers. Woodcutting and woodworking have also been important activities for the locals throughout history, with the activity expanding in scale in recent years. A large part of the population also works in the public sector, in education, health, administration, telecommunications and rail.

Valea Vișeului railway station is an important railway station in Maramureș County, the village having direct links with some of the main cities of Romania, such as Bucharest, Timișoara, Cluj-Napoca, and Mangalia (only in summer). A railway line connecting with Rakhiv in Ukraine closed in 2011, but, following the 2022 Russian invasion of Ukraine, which hindered the country's ability to export by sea, CFR began work on restoring the railway line, reopening it in October 2022.

== Demographics ==
At the 2011 census, the population was divided by village as follows:

- 1,017 in Bistra
- 1,491 in Valea Vișeului
- 1,666 in Crasna Vișeului

=== Ethnicity ===
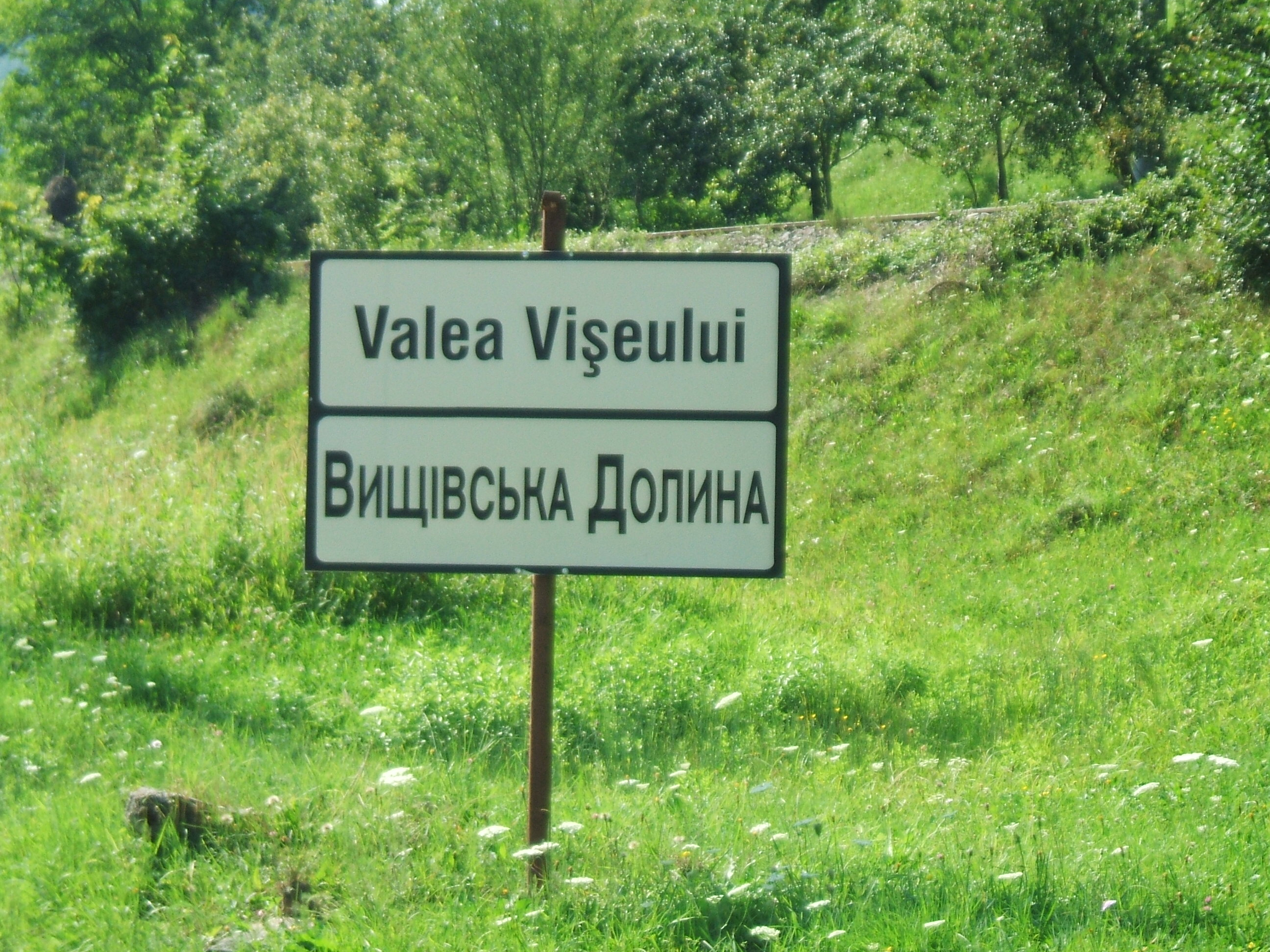
Entrance into Valea Vișeului - sign in Romanian and Ukrainian

According to the 2011 census, the commune had a population of 4,174 inhabitants, of which 84.88% were Ukrainians and 10.61% Romanians. Because Ukrainians make up the majority of the population, the Ukrainian language is used beside Romanian, with signage, education, access to justice, and public services being provided in both languages. At the 2021 census, Bistra had a population of 3,716.

=== Religion ===
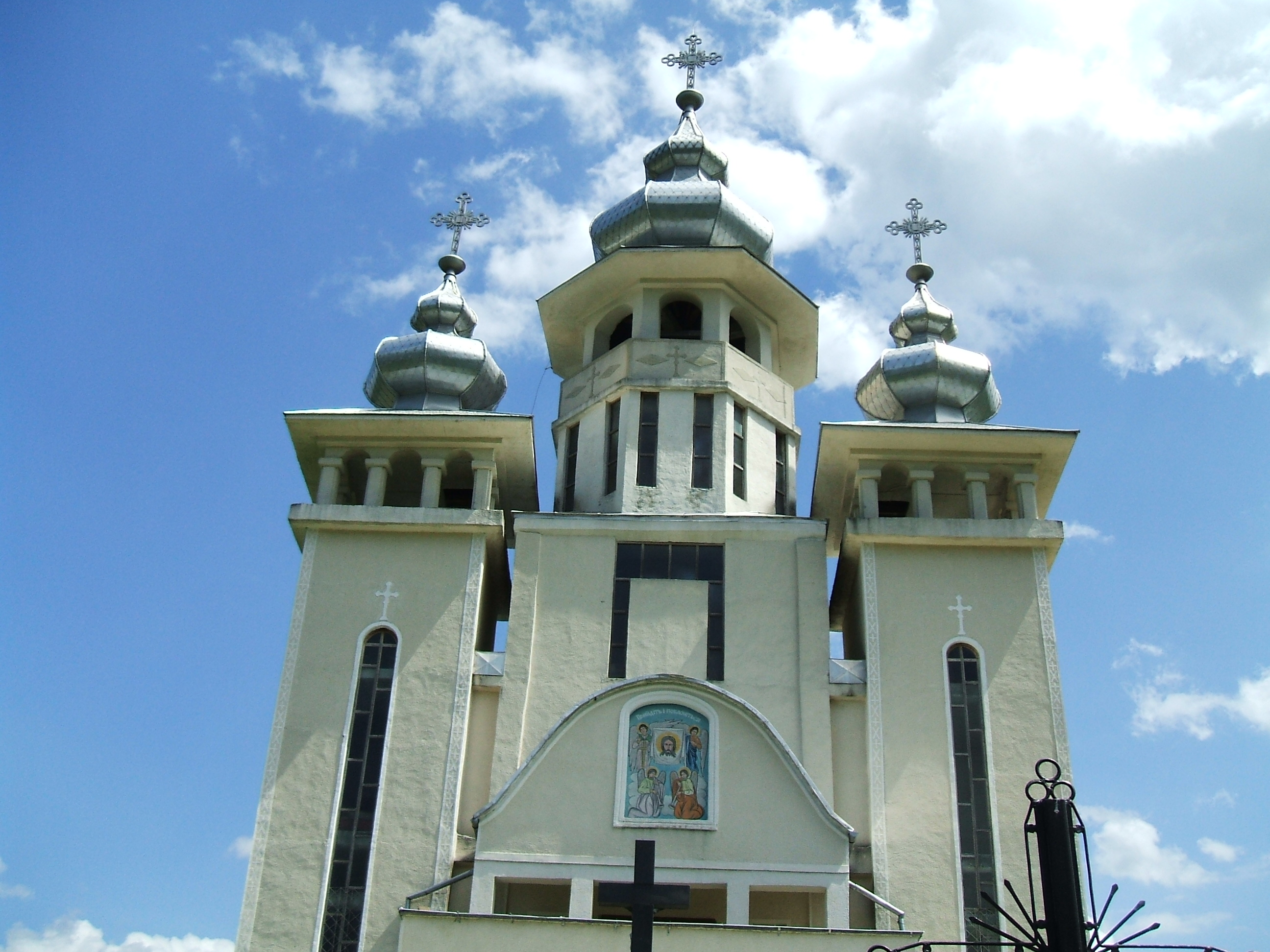
The Pogorârea Sfântului Duh Orthodox Church in Valea Vișeului

The Majority of the population is Orthodox Christian, and has been since the arrival of the first settlers, as outlined by Alexandru Filipașcu in 'The History of Maramureș'.

The first wooden church built in Bistra dates back to 1856. Between 1960 and 1965 it was renovated and modified, and in 1992, it was destroyed following a fire. The first church in Valea Vișeului was built in 1880, and the first in Crasna Vișeului in 1882. The commune's 3 churches are headed by Priests Săcăluș (Valea-Vișeului), Ion Ardelean (Bistra) and Vasile Ardelean (Crasna Vișeului).

== Administration and politics ==
=== Current ===
Vasile Duciuc of the National Liberal Party was re-elected as mayor of Bistra commune for a third term in the 2020 Romanian local elections.

Mayors of Bistra commune
Name	Party	Term
Vasile Duciuc	PNL	2020-2024
Vasile Duciuc	PNL	2016-2020
Vasile Duciuc	PNL	2012-2016
Vasile Bumbar	PDL	2008-2012
Vasile Bumbar	PD	2004-2008
Vasile Oniujec	PNL	2000-2004

Local Council of Bistra commune
Party	Seats
National Liberal Party	6
Coalition for Maramureș (Social Democratic Party-led coalition)	3
Union of the Ukrainians of Romania	2
Cultural Union of Ruthenians of Romania	2

=== Historical ===
Bistra became a commune in 1913.

List of mayors:

- Feodor Dutciuc
- Mihai Mascaliuc
- Dumitru Ciubica
- Mihai Marchis
- Nicolae Cocerjuc
- Vasile Anisorae
- Petru Maricee
- Ștefania Roman
- Dumitru Coreniue
- Vasile Onujec

Crasna Vișeului was autonomous between 1945 and 1968, then incorporated into Bistra commune.

List of mayors:

- Ivan Baraniuc
- Nicolae Romaniuc
- Nicolae Bilcee
- Dumitru Gredjuc

Valea Vișeului was historically either administered by Rona de Sus or autonomous.

List of mayors:

- Ștefan Soriceae (1918)
- Nicolae Frasin (1926–1940)
- Petruț Iurcut (1940–1944)
- Petru Papariga (1944–1950)

== Natives ==
- Vasile Marchiș (born 1972), football player

== Image gallery ==
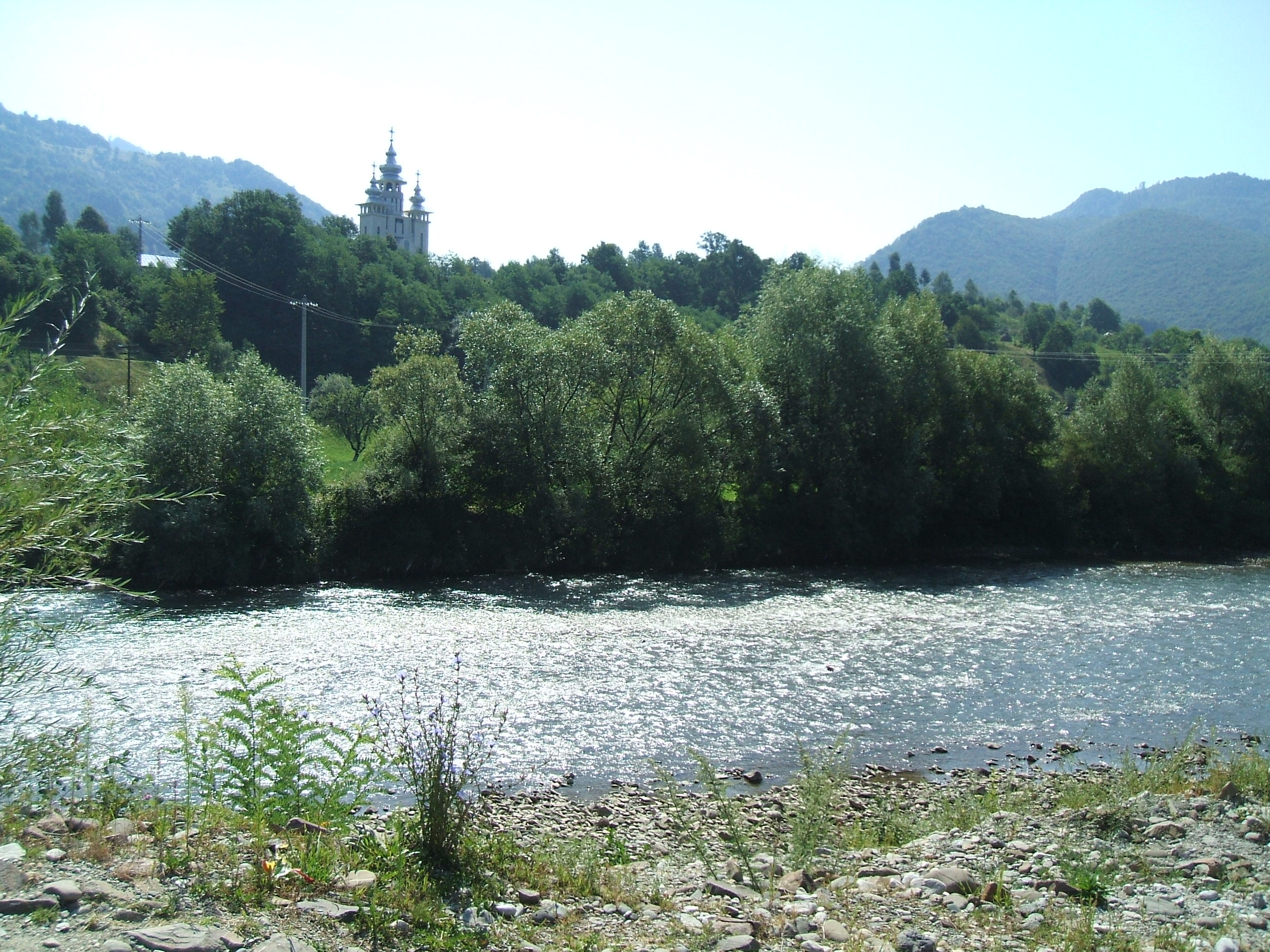
Vișeu River in Valea Vișeului

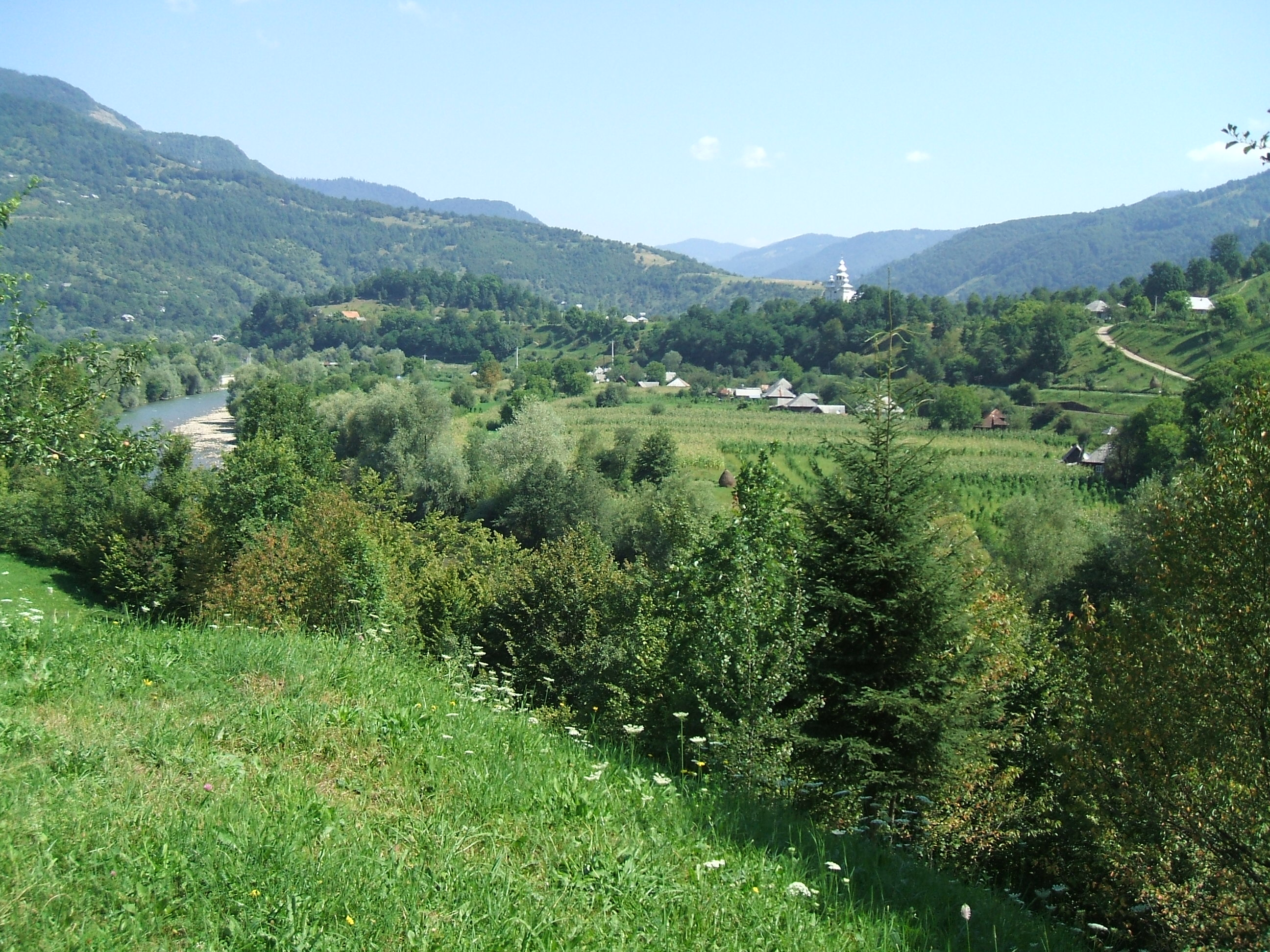
The village pictured from the left bank of the Vișeu River

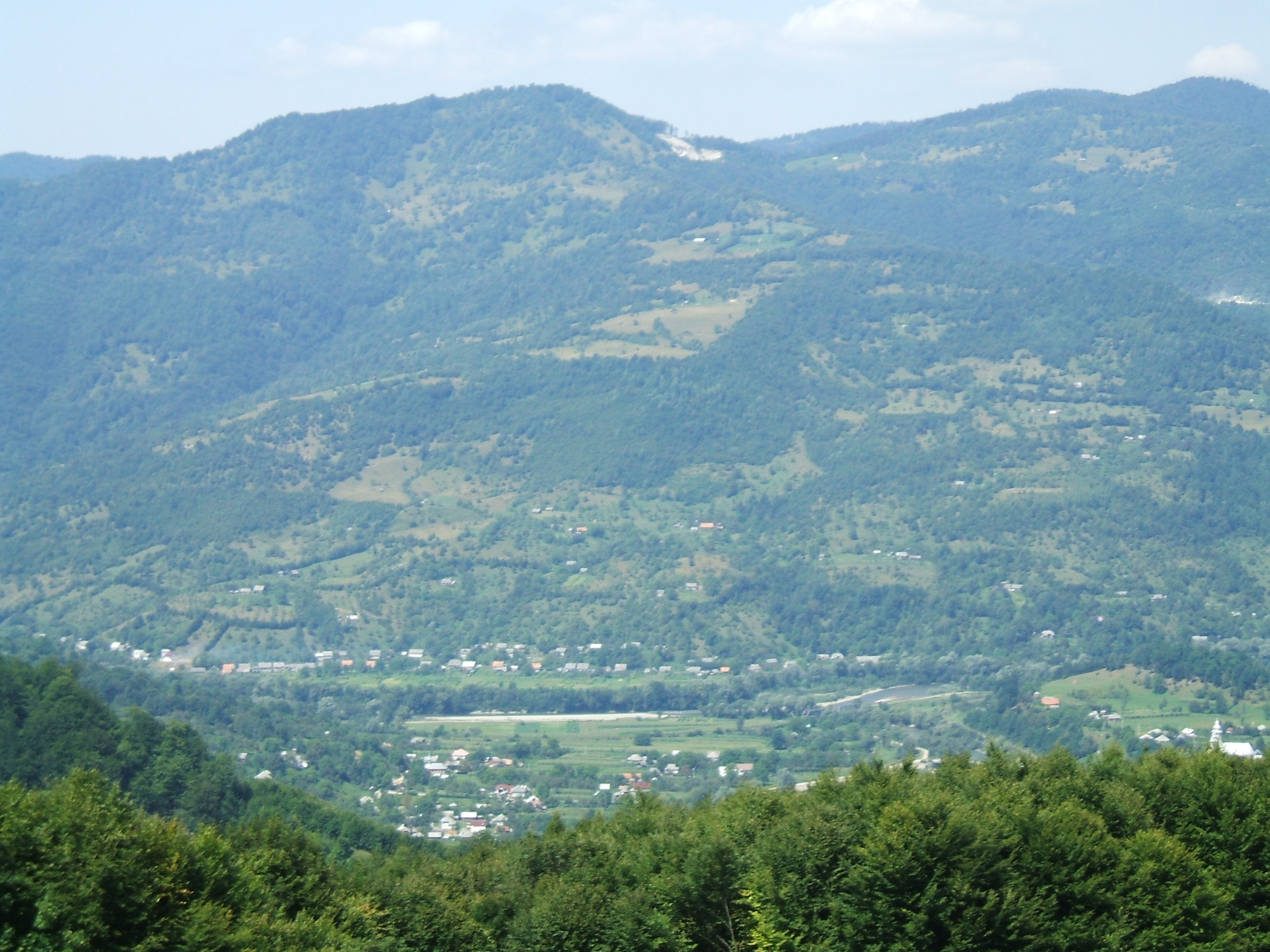
Landscape

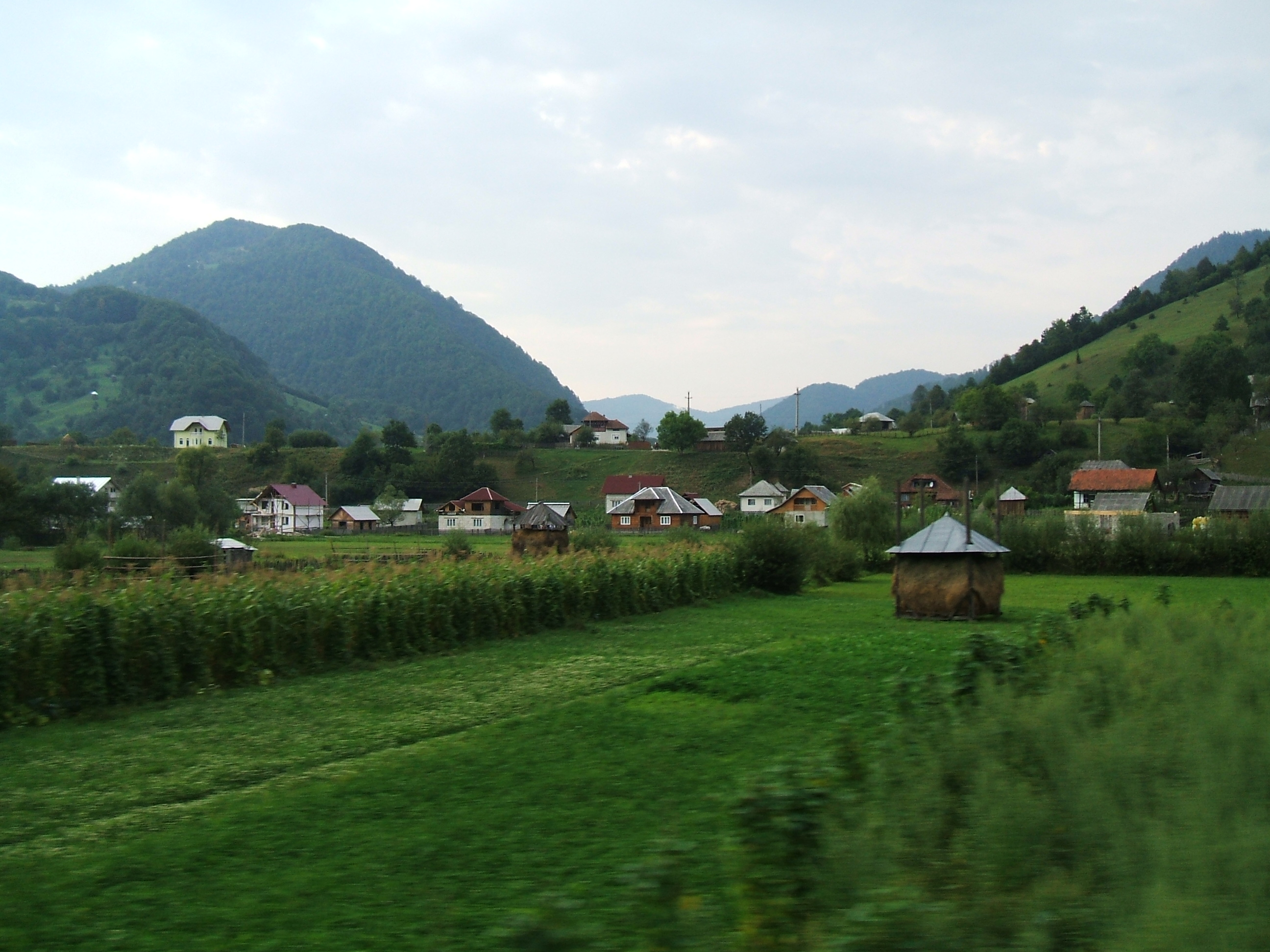
Bistra village
