= Fântânele River =

Fântânele River may refer to:

- Fântânele, a tributary of the Sebeș in Brașov County
- Fântânele, a tributary of the Sibișel in Hunedoara County

== See also ==
- Fântânele (disambiguation)
- Fântâna River (disambiguation)
