= Pârâul Pietros (Vișeu) =

- Location within Romania

Location
- Country: Romania
- Counties: Maramureș County

Physical characteristics
- Source: Rodna Mountains
  - elevation: 1,825 m (5,988 ft)
- Mouth: Vișeu
  - location: Borșa
  - coordinates: 47.6535°N 24.6682°E
- Length: 7 km (4.3 mi)
- Basin size: 12 km^{2} (4.6 sq mi)

Basin features
- Progression: Vișeu→ Tisza→ Danube→ Black Sea

The Pârâul Pietros is a left tributary of the river Vișeu in Romania. It discharges into the Vișeu in the town centre of Borșa. Its length is 7 km (4.3 mi) and its basin size is 12 km^{2} (4.6 sq mi).
