= Cisla (Vișeu) =

Cisla Țâșla
- Location within Romania

Location
- Country: Romania
- Counties: Maramureș County
- Villages: Băile Borșa

Physical characteristics
- Mouth: Vișeu
  - location: Borșa
  - coordinates: 47.6557°N 24.6488°E
- Length: 20 km (12 mi)
- Basin size: 103 km^{2} (40 sq mi)

Basin features
- Progression: Vișeu→ Tisza→ Danube→ Black Sea
- Tributaries
  - left: Bălășina
  - right: Catarama, Secul

The Cisla or Țâșla is a right tributary of the river Vișeu in Romania. It discharges into the Vișeu in Borșa. Its length is 20 km (12 mi) and its basin size is 103 km^{2} (40 sq mi).
