= Stiol Lake =

Lake in Romania

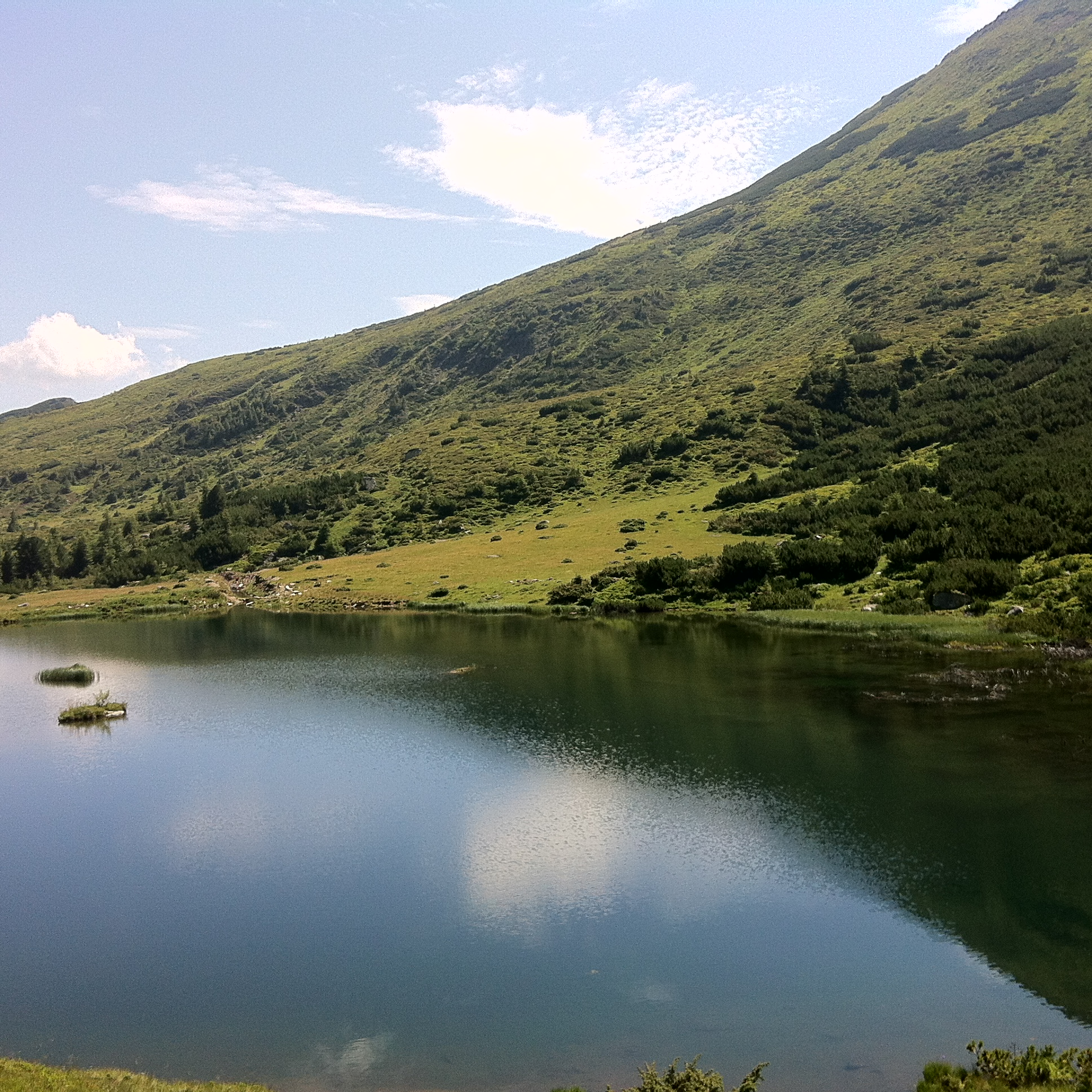
Stiol Lake, Romania

Știol Lake (Lacul Știol) is a glacial lake situated in the Rodna Mountains, near the city of Borșa, Maramureș County, Romania at a height of 1,800 metres (5,900 feet), near the Gârgălău Peak (2,159 m). The lake is also called Lake Izvorul Bistriței Aurii, because from here springs the Bistrița River. The Știol Lake is in Maramureș County, at its eastern end.
