= Drăguiasa =

- Location within Romania

Location
- Country: Romania
- Counties: Maramureș County
- Villages: Vișeu de Jos

Physical characteristics
- Mouth: Vișeu
  - location: Vișeu de Jos
  - coordinates: 47.7284°N 24.3572°E
- Length: 8 km (5.0 mi)
- Basin size: 18 km^{2} (6.9 sq mi)

Basin features
- Progression: Vișeu→ Tisza→ Danube→ Black Sea

The Drăguiasa is a left tributary of the river Vișeu in Romania. It discharges into the Vișeu in Vișeu de Jos. Its length is 8 km (5.0 mi) and its basin size is 18 km^{2} (6.9 sq mi).
