= Alexandru Ioan Cuza (disambiguation) =

Alexandru Ioan Cuza (1820–1873) was the first ruler of the United Principalities of Moldavia and Wallachia.

Alexandru Ioan Cuza may also refer to:

- Alexandru Al. Ioan Cuza (1862/4–1889), Romanian aristocrat and politician, son of Alexandru Ioan Cuza
- Alexandru Ioan Cuza, Cahul, Moldova
- Alexandru Ioan Cuza, Iași, Romania
  - Alexandru Ioan Cuza University, in Iași, Romania
- Alexandru Ioan Cuza, a village administered by Fundulea, Romania

== See also ==
- A. C. Cuza (1857–1947), a Romanian far-right politician
