= Izvorul Dragoș =

- Location within Romania

Location
- Country: Romania
- Counties: Maramureș County

Physical characteristics
- Source
  - location: Rodna Mountains
- Mouth: Vișeu
  - coordinates: 47.6580°N 24.5880°E
- Length: 11 km (6.8 mi)
- Basin size: 33 km^{2} (13 sq mi)

Basin features
- Progression: Vișeu→ Tisza→ Danube→ Black Sea

The Izvorul Dragoș is a left tributary of the river Vișeu in Romania. It discharges into the Vișeu near Moisei. Its length is 11 km (6.8 mi) and its basin size is 33 km^{2} (13 sq mi).
