= Frumușeaua =

- Location within Romania

Location
- Country: Romania
- Counties: Maramureș County

Physical characteristics
- Mouth: Vișeu
  - coordinates: 47.8292°N 24.2255°E
- Length: 15 km (9.3 mi)
- Basin size: 53 km^{2} (20 sq mi)

Basin features
- Progression: Vișeu→ Tisza→ Danube→ Black Sea

The Frumușeaua is a right tributary of the river Vișeu in Romania. It discharges into the Vișeu near Petrova. Its length is 15 km (9.3 mi) and its basin size is 53 km^{2} (20 sq mi).
