= Moisei =

- Commune
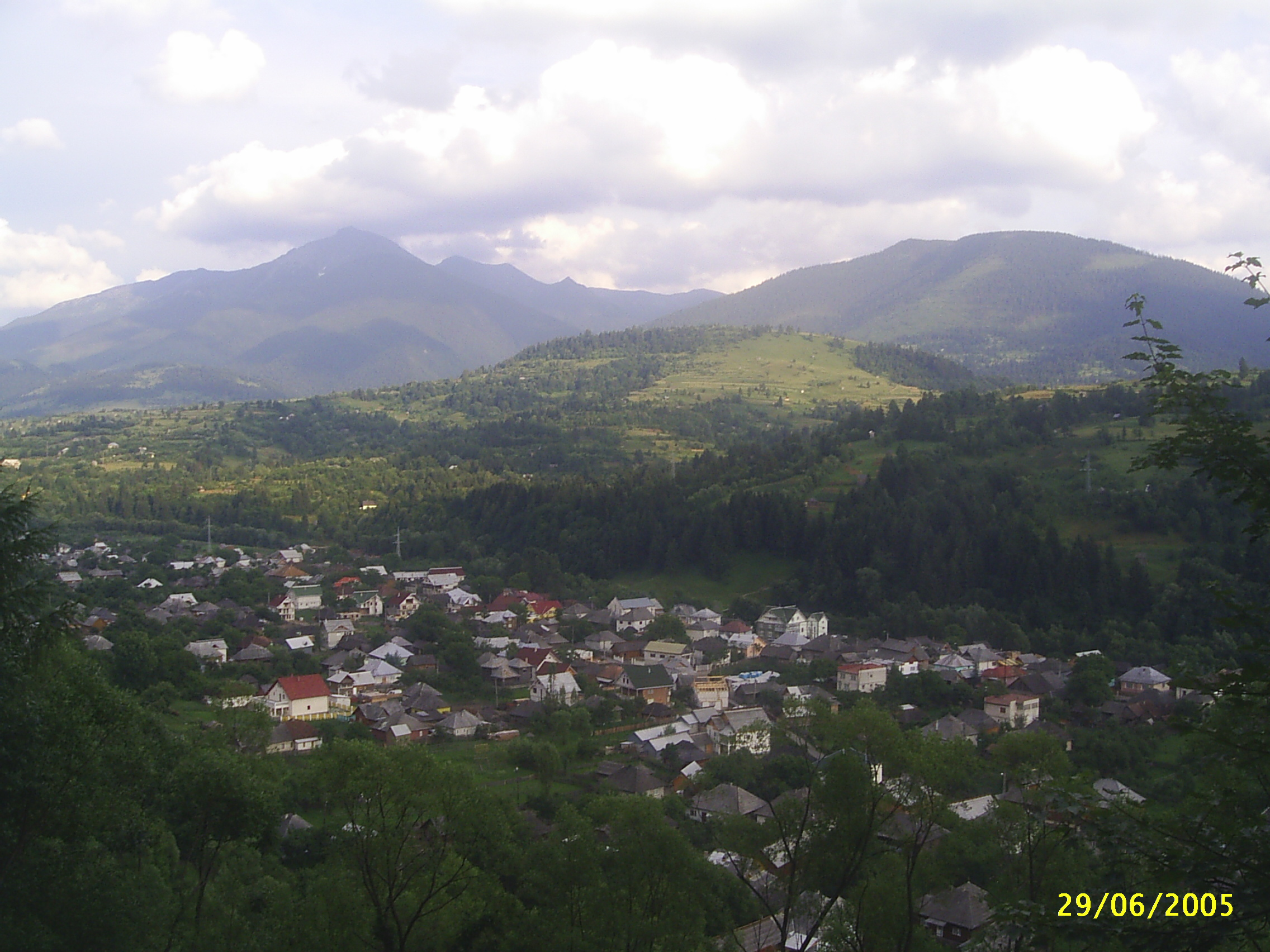

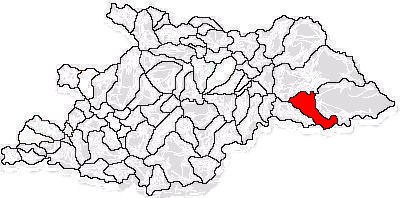
- Location in Maramureș County

- Location in Romania
- Coordinates: 47°39′22″N 24°32′17″E
- Country: Romania
- County: Maramureș
- Established: 1213 (first attested)

Government
  - Mayor (2020–2024): Grigore Tomoiagă (PNL)
- Area: 112.63 km^{2} (43.49 sq mi)
- Elevation: 568 m (1,864 ft)
- Highest elevation: 800 m (2,600 ft)
- Population (2021-12-01): 9,317
  - Density: 82.72/km^{2} (214.2/sq mi)
- Time zone: UTC+02:00 (EET)
  - Summer (DST): UTC+03:00 (EEST)
- Postal code: 437195
- Area code: (+40) 02 62
- Vehicle reg.: MM
- Website: primariamoisei.ro

Moisei (Hungarian: Majszin, Yiddish: מאסיף, romanized: Masif) is a commune in Maramureș County, Maramureș, Romania. Composed of a single village, Moisei, it is one of the oldest communes in Maramureș County, first attested in 1213. This place is well known for the monastery near the village, founded in 1672.

It is the site of the Moisei massacre which occurred on 14 October 1944, when 39 Romanians and 3 Jews were killed by the Hungarian Army. A monument to the victims of the massacre was built in Moisei by sculptor Gheza Vida in 1965.

== General presentation ==
Moisei is located in the southeastern part of Maramureș County, at 136 km (85 mi) from Baia Mare, the county seat, at 5 km from Borșa and at 7 km from Vișeu de Sus. The village is located mainly on the river Vișeu’s course, on Dragoș Spring and on Black Spring (Black Valley). Together, these waterways constitute the main landscape of the village, along with the houses that are built on hills up to 800 m (2,600 ft) high.

The commune is situated in the relief unit called Maramureș Hollow, under the Vișeu corridor. Practically, Moisei is placed at the bottom of Rodna Mountains, having Pietrosu Peak on its upper side and the Maramureș Mountains to the north. Passage from Lunca Vișeului to the mountain area is made naturally from hills with heights between 600 and 800 m.

The commune has two main roads: DN17 and DN18. The total length of the roads and lanes is 44.7 km (27.8 mi), of which 15 km (9.3 mi) are national roads. Moisei also has a Căile Ferate Române train station.

Historical population
Year	Pop.	±%
1880	2,417	—
1900	3,482	+44.1%
1910	4,093	+17.5%
1930	5,240	+28.0%
1956	6,337	+20.9%
1977	7,954	+25.5%
1992	8,961	+12.7%
2002	9,023	+0.7%
2011	9,264	+2.7%
2021	9,317	+0.6%
Source: Census data
