= Bistra (Vișeu) =

- Location within Romania

Location
- Country: Romania
- Counties: Maramureș County
- Villages: Bistra

Physical characteristics
- Mouth: Vișeu
  - location: Bistra
  - coordinates: 47.8657°N 24.2023°E
- Length: 10 km (6.2 mi)
- Basin size: 24 km^{2} (9.3 sq mi)

Basin features
- Progression: Vișeu→ Tisza→ Danube→ Black Sea

The Bistra is a right tributary of the river Vișeu in Romania. It discharges into the Vișeu in the village Bistra. Its length is 10 km (6.2 mi) and its basin size is 24 km^{2} (9.3 sq mi).
