= Pârâul Țigăncilor =

- Location within Romania

Location
- Country: Romania
- Counties: Iași County
- Villages: Ruginoasa, Volintirești, Alexandru Ioan Cuza

Physical characteristics
- Mouth: Siret
  - location: Alexandru Ioan Cuza
  - coordinates: 47.1261°N 26.8545°E
- Length: 22 km (14 mi)
- Basin size: 93 km^{2} (36 sq mi)

Basin features
- Progression: Siret→ Danube→ Black Sea
- Tributaries
  - left: Vătașnița, După Fântână
- River code: XII.1.34

The Pârâul Țigăncilor is a left tributary of the river Siret in Romania. It flows into the Siret at Alexandru Ioan Cuza. Its length is 22 km (14 mi) and its basin size is 93 km^{2} (36 sq mi).
