= Fântâna =

Fântâna may refer to several places in Romania:

- Fântâna, a village in Hoghiz Commune, Braşov County
- Fântâna, a village in Lunca Cernii de Jos Commune, Hunedoara County
- Fântâna, a tributary of the Vișeu in Maramureș County
- Fântâna Fătului, a tributary of the Balasan in Dolj County
- Fântâna Tulbure, a tributary of the Muereasca in Vâlcea County
- După Fântână, a tributary of the Pârâul Țigăncilor in Iași County

== See also ==
- Fântânele (disambiguation)
- Fîntînița, a commune in Drochia district, Moldova
