= Israel Polack =

Romanian-Israeli industrialist (1909–1993)

Israel Pollak
- ישראל פולק
- Born: 1909; Borșa, Maramureș, Austria-Hungary
- Died: 1993 (aged 83–84)
- Occupation: Textile industrialist
- Known for: Founder of Polgat
- Spouse: Edith Zoref
- Awards: Israel Prize (1990)

Israel Pollak (Hebrew: ישראל פולק; 1909–1993) was an Austro-Hungarian-born Romanian, Chilean and Israeli textile industrialist. He is best known for founding the Israel-based Polgat company.

== Biography ==
Israel Pollak was born to a Jewish Orthodox family in Borșa, east Maramureș. In 1925, he moved to Gura Humorului, Bukovina, and later to Cernăuți. While in Cernăuți he studied at yeshiva and at a textile plant. In 1935, he founded an enterprise of its kind in the city. There he married Edith Zoref.

== Business career ==
After World War II, he emigrated to Chile where his brother Marcos had emigrated before the war. There with his brothers and brothers-in-laws he founded the "Pollak Hnos." textile company. In 1960, Pinhas Sapir, then Israel's Minister of Industry, invited Pollak to make aliyah and to establish a textile plant in Kiryat Gat. The Pollak's new company, Polgat, grew into the largest textile, clothing and knitwear company in Israel. It eventually became a public corporation whose shares were traded on the Tel Aviv Stock Exchange. In 1970, the Pollaks founded Bagir, a men's division for suits and jackets.

== Awards and recognition ==
In 1990, Pollak was awarded the Israel Prize for his special contribution to society and the State of Israel.

In 1992, he was honored by the Hebrew University in Jerusalem.

In 1993, he was honored by the Technion in Haifa.

== See also ==
- Israeli fashion
- List of Israel Prize recipients
