= Fântânele =

Fântânele may refer to several places in Romania:

- Fântânele, Arad, a commune in Arad County
- Fântânele, Constanța, a commune in Constanţa County
- Fântânele, Iași, a commune in Iaşi County
- Fântânele, Mureș, a commune in Mureș County
- Fântânele, Prahova, a commune in Prahova County
- Fântânele, Suceava, a commune in Suceava County
- Fântânele, Teleorman, a commune in Teleorman County
- Fântânele, a village in Ceru-Băcăinți Commune, Alba County
- Fântânele, a village in Hemeiuș Commune, Bacău County
- Fântânele, a village in Motoșeni Commune, Bacău County
- Fântânele, a village in Matei Commune, Bistriţa-Năsăud County
- Fântânele, a village in Mărgăritești Commune, Buzău County
- Fântânele, a village in Năeni Commune, Buzău County
- Fântânele, a village in Cojasca Commune, Dâmboviţa County
- Fântânele, a village in Radovan Commune, Dolj County
- Fântânele, a village in Teslui Commune, Dolj County
- Fântânele, a village in Scânteiești Commune, Galaţi County
- Fântânele, a village in Urdari Commune, Gorj County
- Fântânele, a village in Andrieşeni Commune, Iaşi County
- Fântânele, a village in Târgu Lăpuş town, Maramureș County
- Fântânele, a village in Dragu Commune, Sălaj County
- Fântânele, a village in Săliște town, Sibiu County
- Fântânele, a village in Puieşti Commune, Vaslui County

== Other ==
- Fântânele River (disambiguation)

== See also ==
- Fântâna (disambiguation)
