= Vișeu de Jos =

- Commune
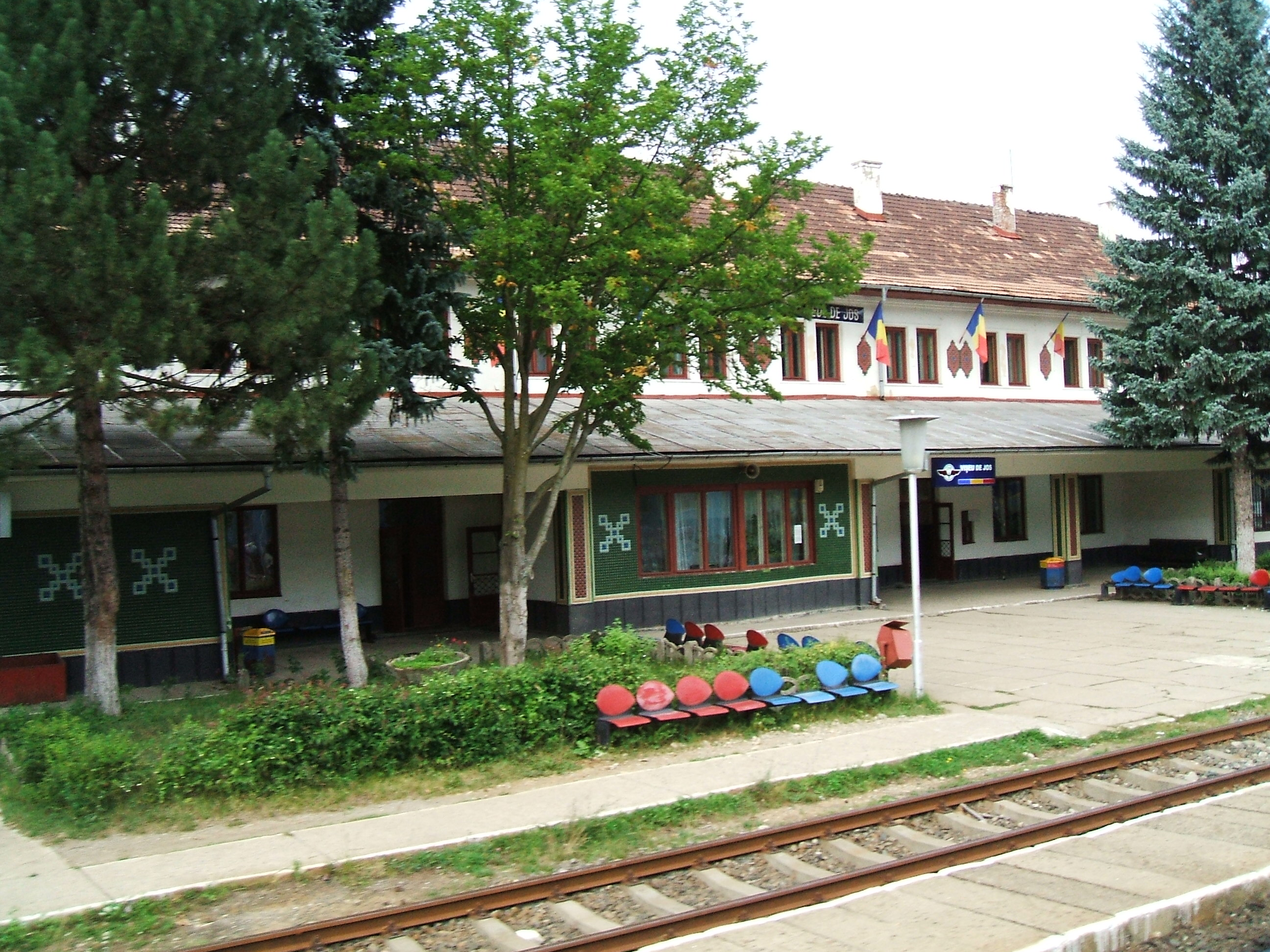
- Vișeu de Jos train station

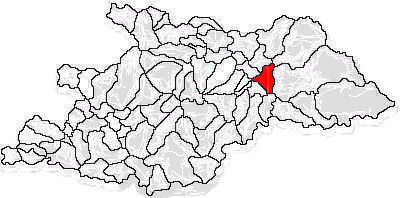
- Location in Maramureș County

- Location in Romania
- Coordinates: 47°43′30″N 24°22′01″E
- Country: Romania
- County: Maramureș

Government
  - Mayor (2020–2024): Gavrilă Simon (PNL)
- Area: 56 km^{2} (22 sq mi)
- Elevation: 458 m (1,503 ft)
- Population (2021-12-01): 5,212
  - Density: 93/km^{2} (240/sq mi)
- Time zone: UTC+02:00 (EET)
  - Summer (DST): UTC+03:00 (EEST)
- Postal code: 437390
- Area code: (+40) 02 62
- Vehicle reg.: MM
- Website: www.primaria-viseudejos.ro

Vișeu de Jos (Hungarian: Alsóvisó, Yiddish: אונטר-ווישווה, romanized: Unter-Visheve or Inter Wisho, German: Unterwischau) is a commune in Maramureș County, Maramureș, Romania. It is composed of a single village, Vișeu de Jos. The river Vișeu, a tributary of the Tisa, flows through this commune.

== Geography ==
The commune is located in the central-east part of the county, at a distance of 6 km (3.7 mi) from the town of Vișeu de Sus and 117 km (73 mi) from the county seat, Baia Mare. It is situated at an altitude of 458 m (1,503 ft), in a hilly area on the banks of the river Bistra. The Maramureș Mountains Natural Park lies to the northeast, between Vișeu de Jos and the Romania–Ukraine border.

The Vișeu de Jos train station serves the CFR Line 409, which runs from Salva in Bistrița-Năsăud County to Sighetu Marmației.

== Demographics ==
At the 2021 census, the commune had a population of 5,212, of which 93.05% were Romanians and 3.18% Roma.

Historical population
Year	Pop.	±%
1880	2,568	—
1900	3,501	+36.3%
1910	3,852	+10.0%
1930	4,814	+25.0%
1956	5,231	+8.7%
1977	5,661	+8.2%
1992	5,731	+1.2%
2002	5,282	−7.8%
2011	4,934	−6.6%
2021	5,212	+5.6%
Source: Census data

== Natives ==
- Gheorghe Bodo (1923 – 2004), footballer
- Vasile Ciolpan (1920 – 2004), director of Sighet Prison (1950–1955)
