= USS Fantana =

Patrol vessel of the United States Navy

History

United States
- Name: USS Fantana
- Namesake: Previous name retained
- Builder: Gas Engine and Power Company and Charles L. Seabury and Sons Company, Morris Heights, New York
- Completed: 1902
- Acquired: 1917
- Commissioned: 17 March 1917
- Decommissioned: 11 January 1919
- Fate: Returned to owner 11 January 1919
- Notes: In use as private yacht motorboat Fantana 1902-1917 and from 1919

General characteristics
- Type: Patrol boat
- Length: 72 ft (22 m)
- Beam: 12 ft 6 in (3.81 m)
- Draft: 3 ft (0.91 m)
- Speed: 15 knots
- Complement: 7
- Armament: 1 × 1-pounder gun

USS Fantana (SP-71) was a motorboat that served in the United States Navy as a patrol boat from 1917 to 1919.

Fantana was built as a private motorboat of the same name in 1902 at Morris Heights, New York, by the Gas Engine and Power Company and the Charles L. Seabury and Sons Company. The U.S. Navy chartered her in 1917 for World War I service and commissioned her on 17 March 1917 as USS Fantana (SP-71).

Fantana was attached to Squadron 8 for patrol and picket duty on stations assigned in the 5th Naval District.

On 24 November 1918, Fantana's crew was detached. She was towed to Norfolk, Virginia, where on 11 January 1919 she was decommissioned and returned to her owner.
