= Alexandru Ioan Cuza, Iași =

Alexandru Ioan Cuza
- Commune
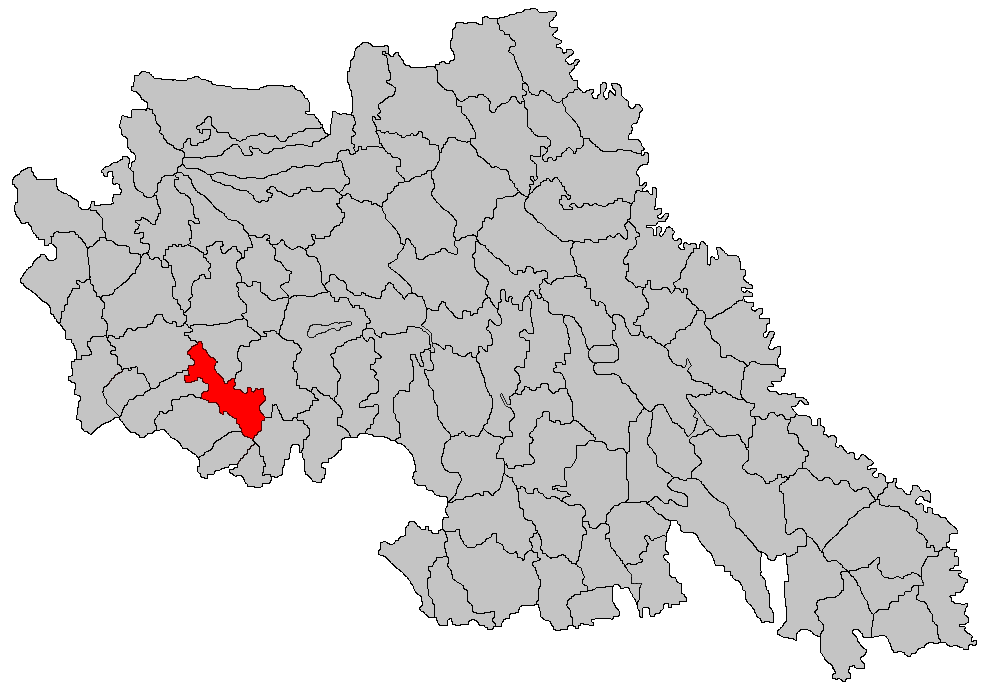
- Location in Iași County

- Location in Romania
- Coordinates: 47°08′N 26°51′E
- Country: Romania
- County: Iași
- Subdivisions: Alexandru Ioan Cuza, Kogălniceni, Șcheia, Volintirești,

Government
  - Mayor (2024–2028): Aurelian Gherguț (PNL)
- Area: 48.63 km^{2} (18.78 sq mi)
- Elevation: 200 m (700 ft)
- Population (2021-12-01): 2,133
  - Density: 44/km^{2} (110/sq mi)
- Time zone: EET/EEST (UTC+2/+3)
- Postal code: 707005
- Area code: +40 x32
- Vehicle reg.: IS
- Website: www.primariaicuza.ro

Alexandru Ioan Cuza is a commune in Iași County, Western Moldavia, Romania. It is composed of four villages: Alexandru Ioan Cuza, Kogălniceni, Șcheia and Volintirești.

The commune is named after 19th century Moldavian and Romanian statesman Alexandru Ioan Cuza.
