= Vișeu =

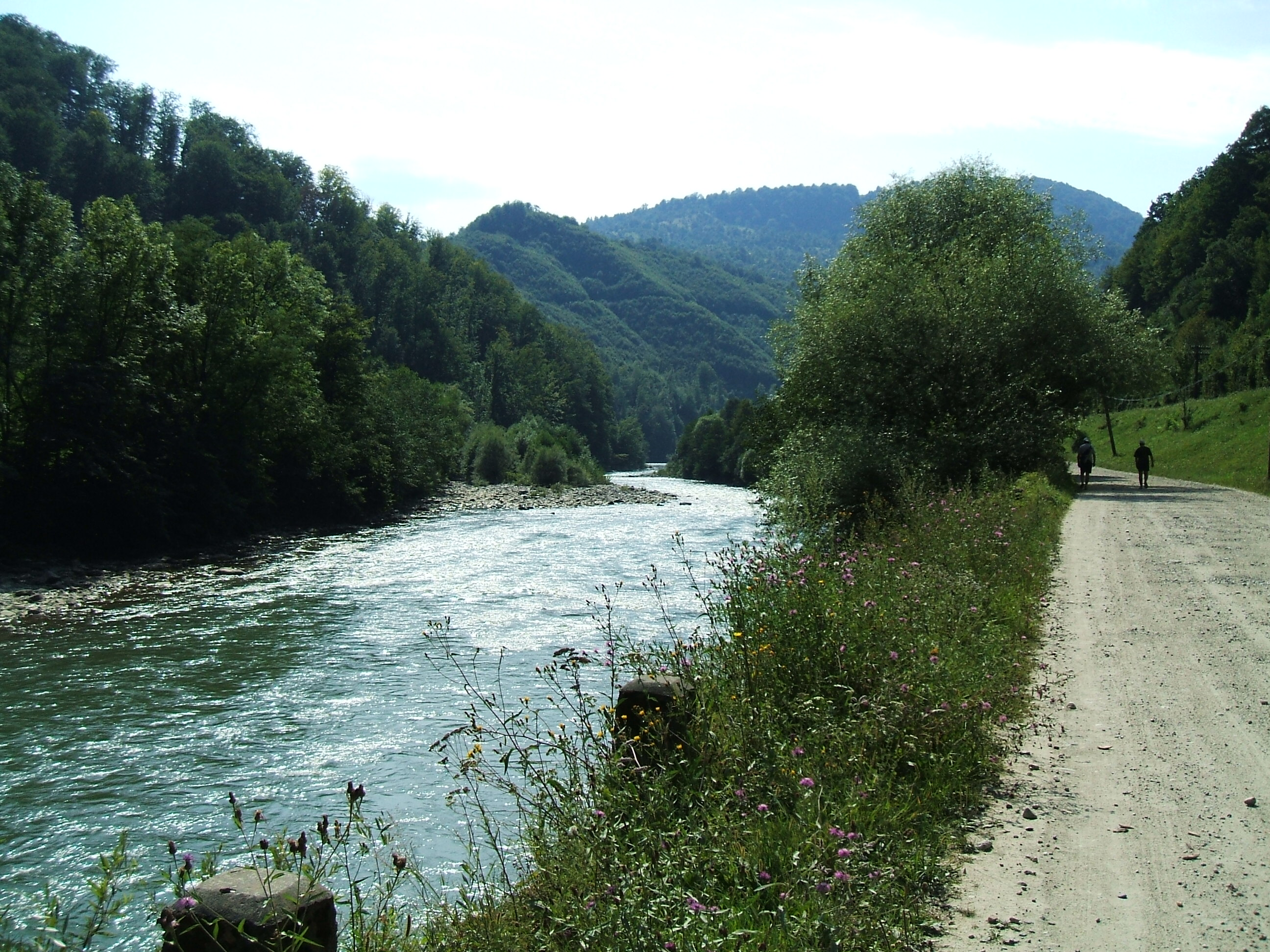

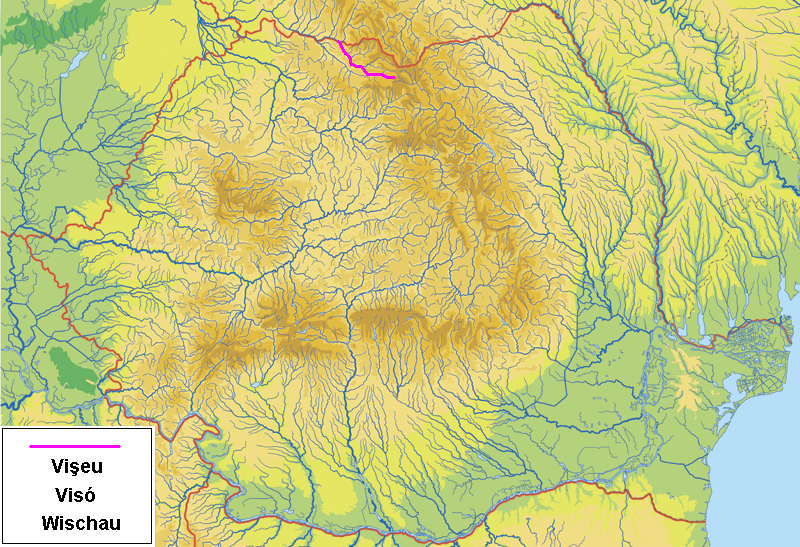
- Vișeu in Romania

Location
- Country: Romania
- Counties: Maramureș
- Towns: Borșa, Vișeu de Sus

Physical characteristics
- Source
  - location: Rodna Mountains, Prislop Pass
  - elevation: 1,409 m (4,623 ft)
- Mouth: Tisza
  - location: Valea Vișeului
  - coordinates: 47°54′46″N 24°8′44″E
  - elevation: 330 m (1,080 ft)
- Length: 82 km (51 mi)
- Basin size: 1,581.8 km^{2} (610.7 mi^{2})
- Discharge
  - location: Near mouth
  - average: (Period: 1971–2000)39.08 m^{3}/s (1,380 cu ft/s)

Basin features
- Progression: Tisza→ Danube→ Black Sea
- Tributaries
  - right: Vaser, Ruscova

The Vișeu (Hungarian: Visó) in northern Romania is a left tributary of the river Tisza. Its source is in the Rodna Mountains. It passes through the following villages, communes and cities: Borșa (city), Moisei (commune), Vișeu de Sus (city), Vișeu de Jos (commune), Leordina (commune), Petrova (commune), Bistra (village), Valea Vișeului (village). In Valea Vișeului village, the river flows into the Tisza. Its length is 82 km (51 mi). Its drainage basin covers an area of 1,581 km^{2} (610 sq mi).

== Tributaries ==
The following rivers are tributaries to the river Vișeu (from source to mouth):

Left: Fântâna, Negoescu, Repedea, Pârâul Pietros, Izvorul Dragoș, Izvorul Negru, Drăguiasa, Bocicoel, Spânu, Mârza, Plăiuț

Right: Cercănel, Cisla, Vaser, Valea Vinului, Valea Morii, Ruscova, Frumușeaua, Bistra, Runcu Mare
