= Petrova, Maramureș =

Petrova
- Commune
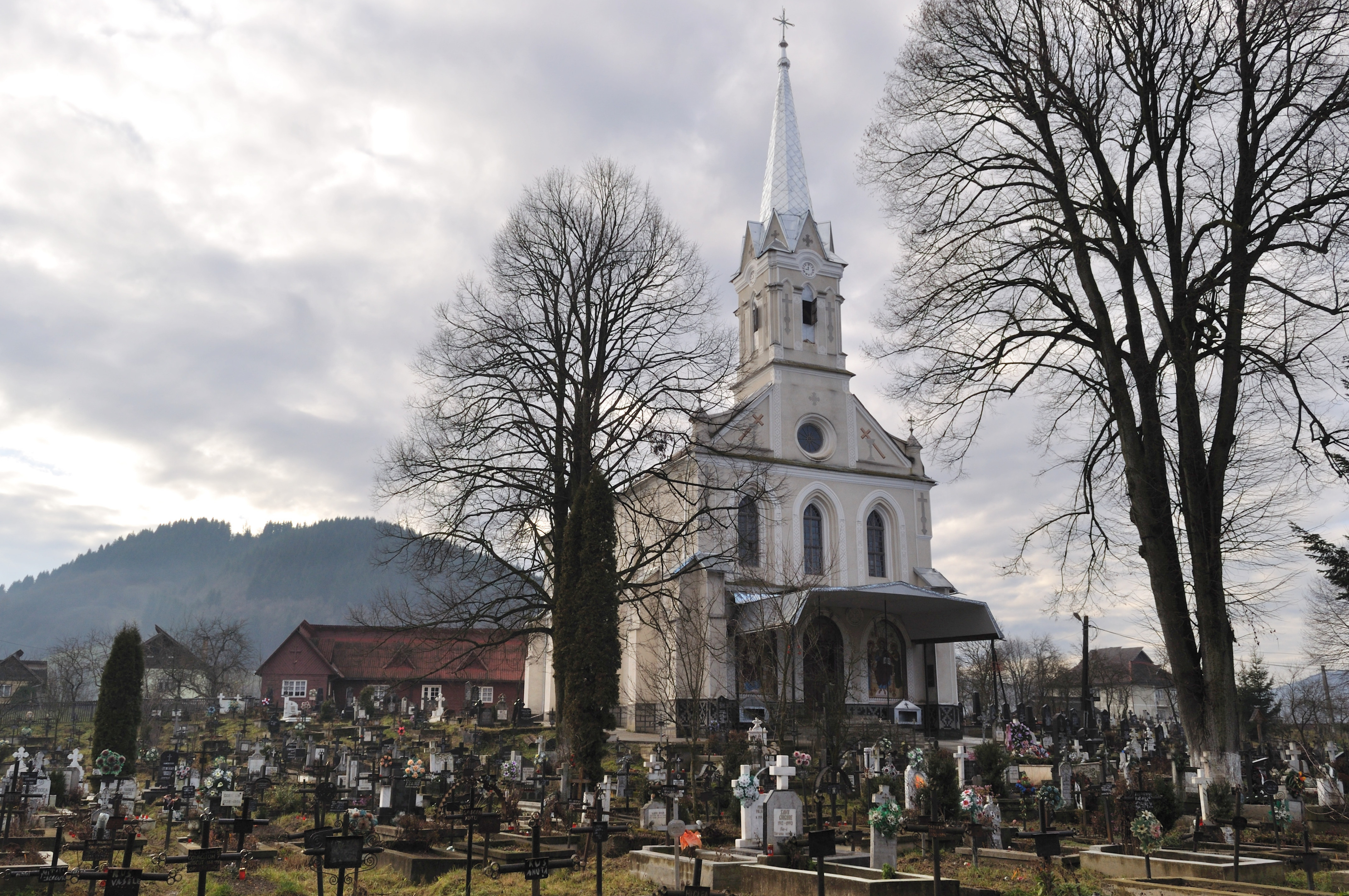
- Dormition of the Theotokos Church in Petrova

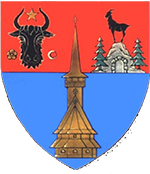
- Coat of arms

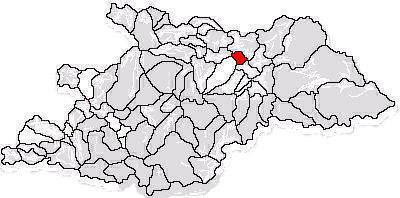
- Location in Maramureș County

- Location in Romania
- Coordinates: 47°49′50″N 24°12′45″E
- Country: Romania
- County: Maramureș

Government
  - Mayor (2020–2024): Ion Petrovai (PNL)
- Area: 42.05 km^{2} (16.24 sq mi)
- Elevation: 358 m (1,175 ft)
- Population (2021-12-01): 2,285
  - Density: 54.34/km^{2} (140.7/sq mi)
- Time zone: UTC+02:00 (EET)
  - Summer (DST): UTC+03:00 (EEST)
- Postal code: 437210
- Area code: (+40) 02 62
- Vehicle reg.: MM
- Website: www.primaria-petrova.ro

Petrova (Ukrainian: Петрова, Yiddish: פטריווה, romanized: Petreve) is a commune in Maramureș County, Maramureș, Romania. It is composed of a single village, Petrova. The commune is situated near the border with Ukraine, on the left bank of the river Vișeu. The first documentary attestation was on 21 April 1411.

Historical population
Year	Pop.	±%
1880	2,311	—
1900	3,350	+45.0%
1910	4,229	+26.2%
1930	4,274	+1.1%
1956	3,303	−22.7%
1977	3,312	+0.3%
1992	2,956	−10.7%
2002	2,693	−8.9%
2011	2,525	−6.2%
2021	2,285	−9.5%
Source: Census data
