= Maramureș Mountains Natural Park =

Protected area in Romania

Munții Maramureșului Natural Park
- Parcul Natural Munții Maramureșului
- IUCN category V (protected landscape/seascape)
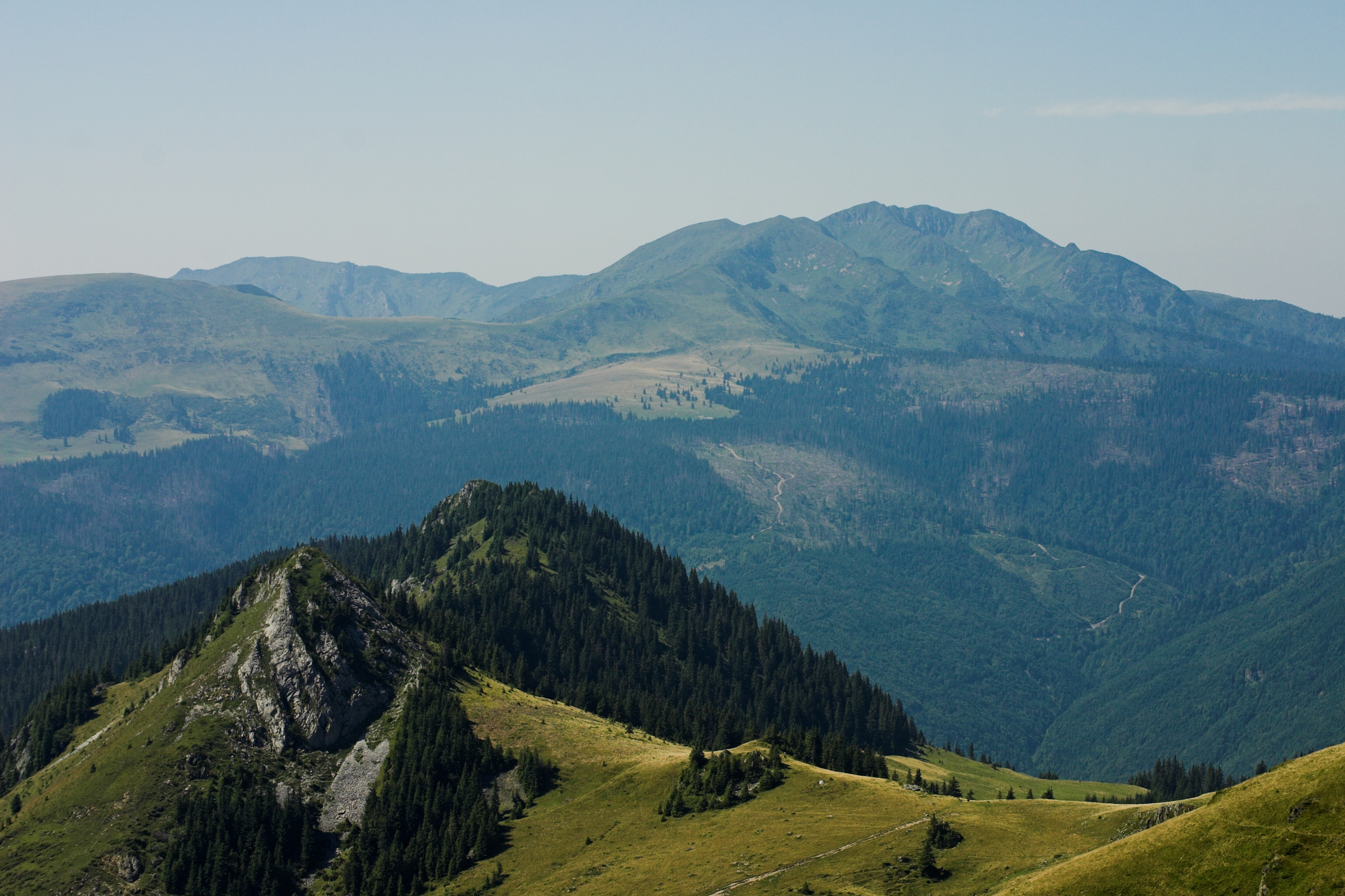
- Maramureș Mountains

- Location within Romania
- Location: Romania; Maramureș County
- Nearest city: Sighetu Marmației
- Coordinates: 47°46′59″N 24°33′50″E
- Area: 148.850 hectares (367.82 acres)
- Established: 2005
- Website: www.muntiimaramuresului.ro

The Maramureș Mountains Natural Park (Romanian: Parcul Natural Munții Maramureșului) is a protected area (natural park category V IUCN) situated in Romania, in the northern part of the Maramureș County.

== See also ==
- Protected areas of Romania
- Rodna National Park
