= Borșa =

- Town
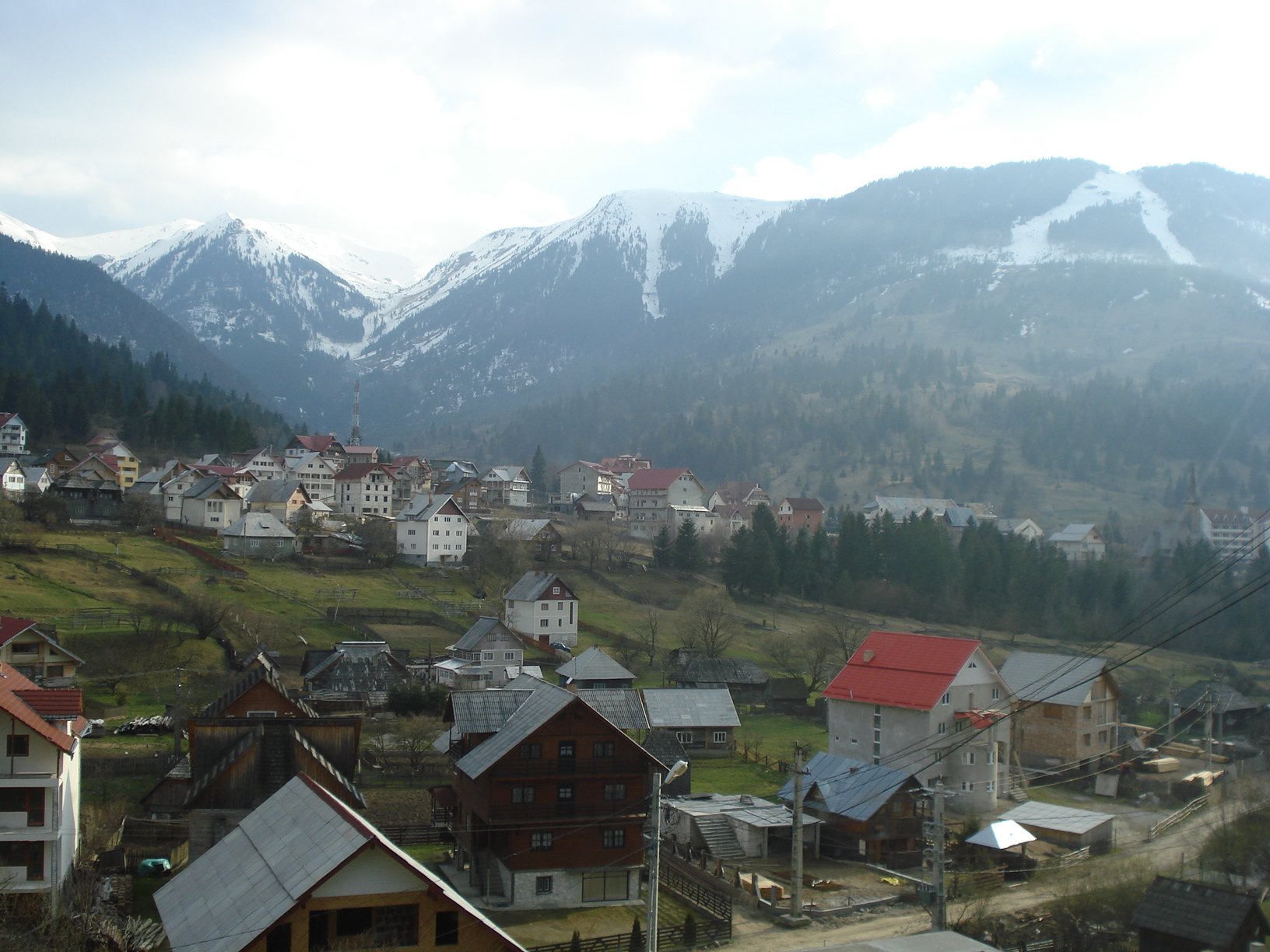
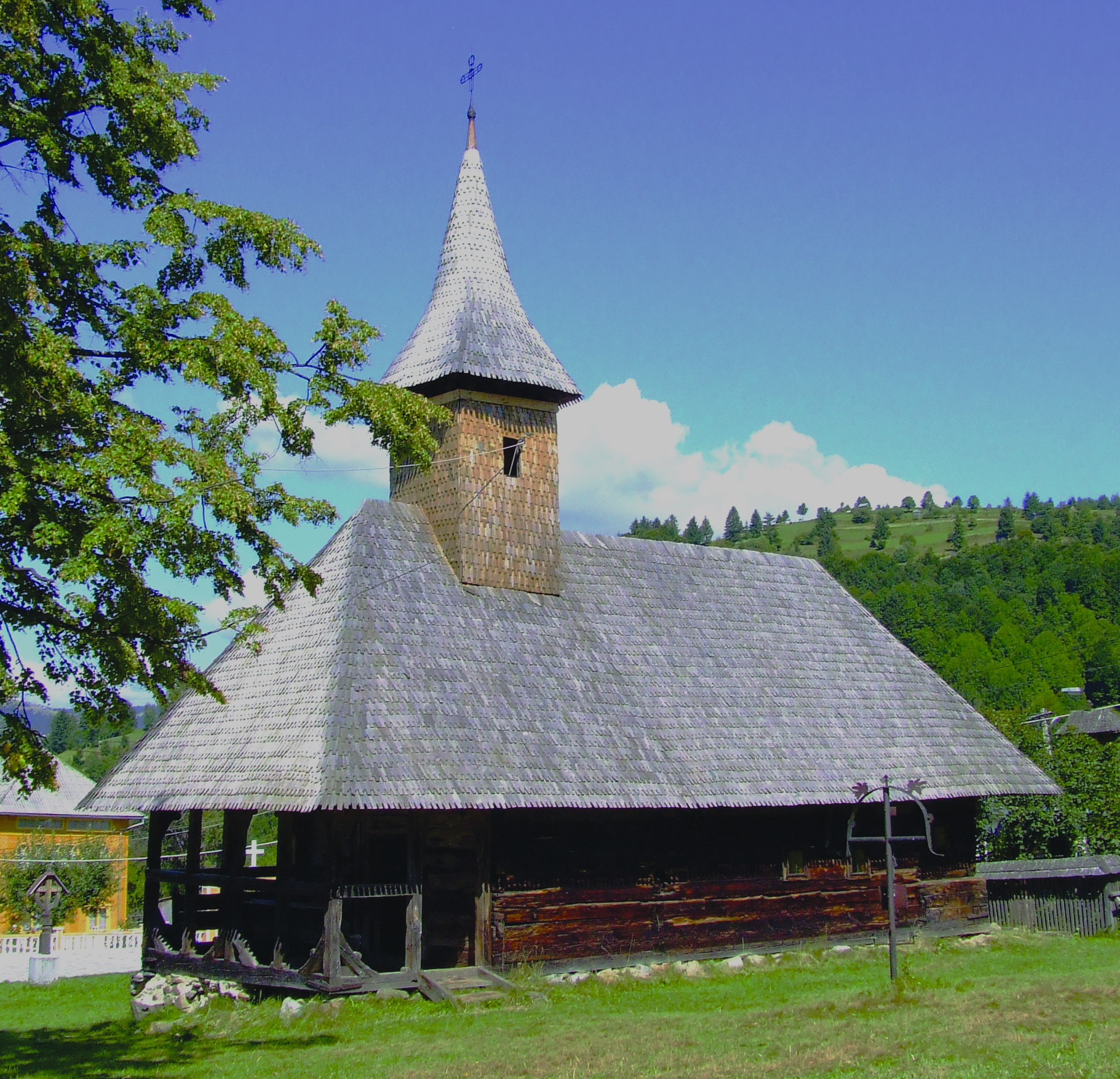
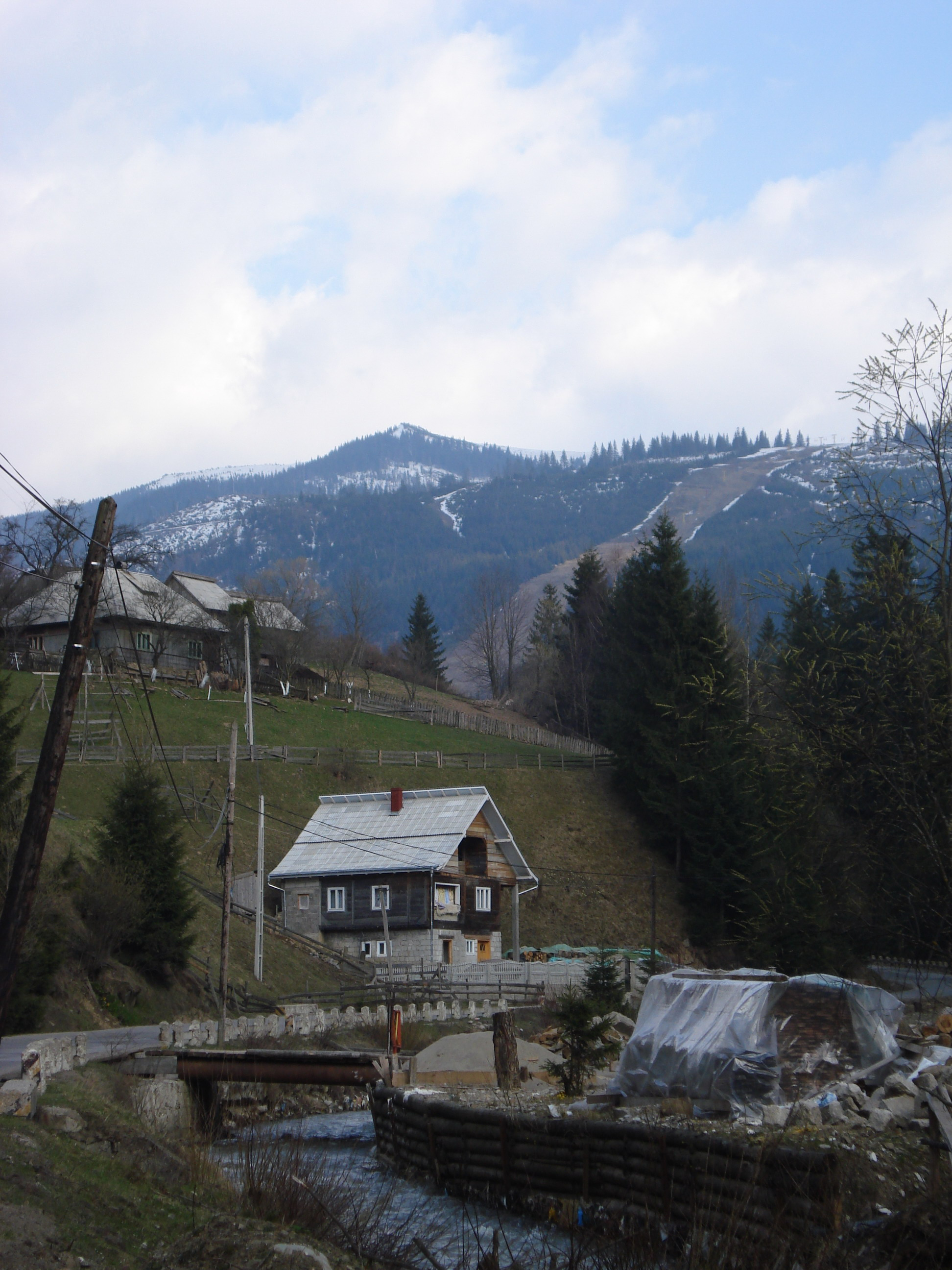
- General view of Borșa Church of the Moisei Monastery Houses in Borșa

- Coat of arms

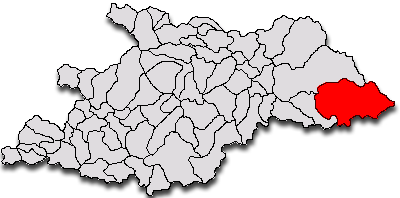
- Location in Maramureș County

- Location in Romania
- Coordinates: 47°39′19″N 24°39′47″E
- Country: Romania
- County: Maramureș

Government
  - Mayor (2024–2028): Ion-Sorin Timiș (PSD)
- Area: 424.12 km^{2} (163.75 sq mi)
- Elevation: 700 m (2,300 ft)
- Highest elevation: 823 m (2,700 ft)
- Lowest elevation: 617 m (2,024 ft)
- Population (2021-12-01): 27,711
  - Density: 65.338/km^{2} (169.22/sq mi)
- Time zone: UTC+02:00 (EET)
  - Summer (DST): UTC+03:00 (EEST)
- Postal code: 435200
- Area code: (+40) 02 62
- Vehicle reg.: MM
- Website: www.primariaborsamm.ro

Borșa (Romanian pronunciation: [ˈborʃa]; Hungarian: Borsa, German: Borscha, Yiddish: בורשא, romanized: Borsa or Borsha) is a town in eastern Maramureș County, Maramureș, Romania. It administers one village, Băile Borșa.

== Geography ==
The town is located at the eastern extremity of Maramureș County, 123 km (76 mi) from the county seat, Baia Mare. Covering 12% of the county's area, it borders Ukraine to the north, Suceava County to the east, Bistrița-Năsăud County to the south, and Moisei commune to the west.

Borșa lies in the valley of the river Vișeu and near the Prislop Pass. Linking Transylvania to Bukovina, Prislop Pass is surrounded by the Rodna and Maramureș Mountains, both ranges of the Carpathians. The highest peak in the region is Pietrosul Rodnei, at 2,303 metres (7,556 feet). The Rodna National Park, which has an area of 463 km^{2} (179 sq mi), can be accessed from Borșa.

The town is crossed by national road DN18, which connects it to the west to Sighetu Marmației and Baia Mare and to the east to Iacobeni, Suceava through the Prislop Pass.

== History ==
The town is home to a wooden church, built in 1718. In 1891, there were 1,432 Jews living in Borșa. The area has lost much of its population following the collapse of the communist regime. In the past, the town of Borșa was also home to a Zipser German community.

== Natives ==
- Gheorghe Mihali (born 1965), football player
- Israel Polack (1909–1993), textile industrialist
- Frank Timiș (born 1964), rich businessman based in London

== Population ==
At the 2021 census, Borșa had a population of 27,711, with an absolute majority (94%) of ethnic Romanians.

Historical population
Year	Pop.	±%
1880	5,528	—
1901	7,758	+40.3%
1910	9,343	+20.4%
1930	11,230	+20.2%
1941	12,294	+9.5%
1956	13,600	+10.6%
1977	24,406	+79.5%
1992	27,450	+12.5%
2002	27,247	−0.7%
2011	27,611	+1.3%
2021	27,711	+0.4%
Source: Census data

== Gallery ==
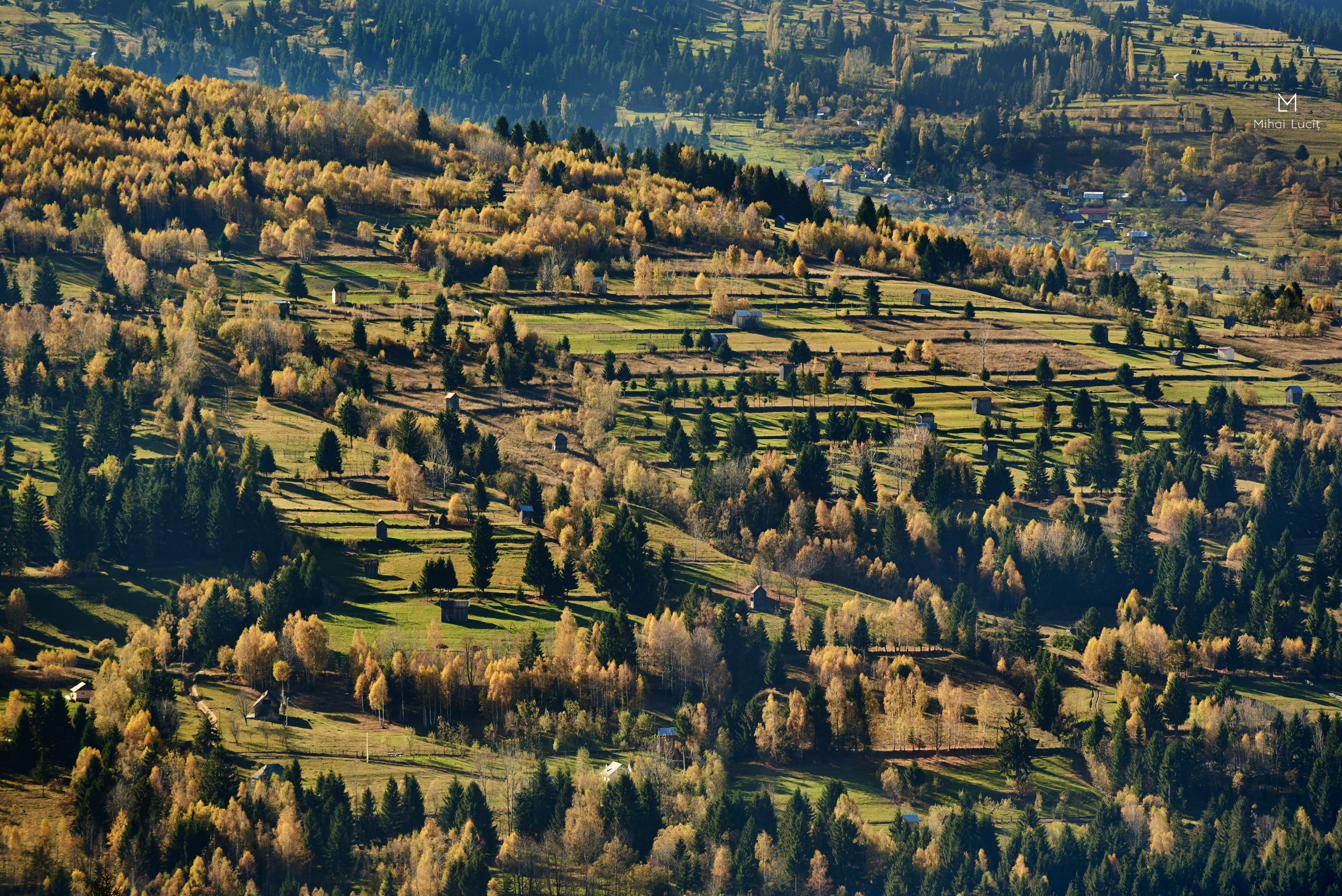
Borșa in autumn

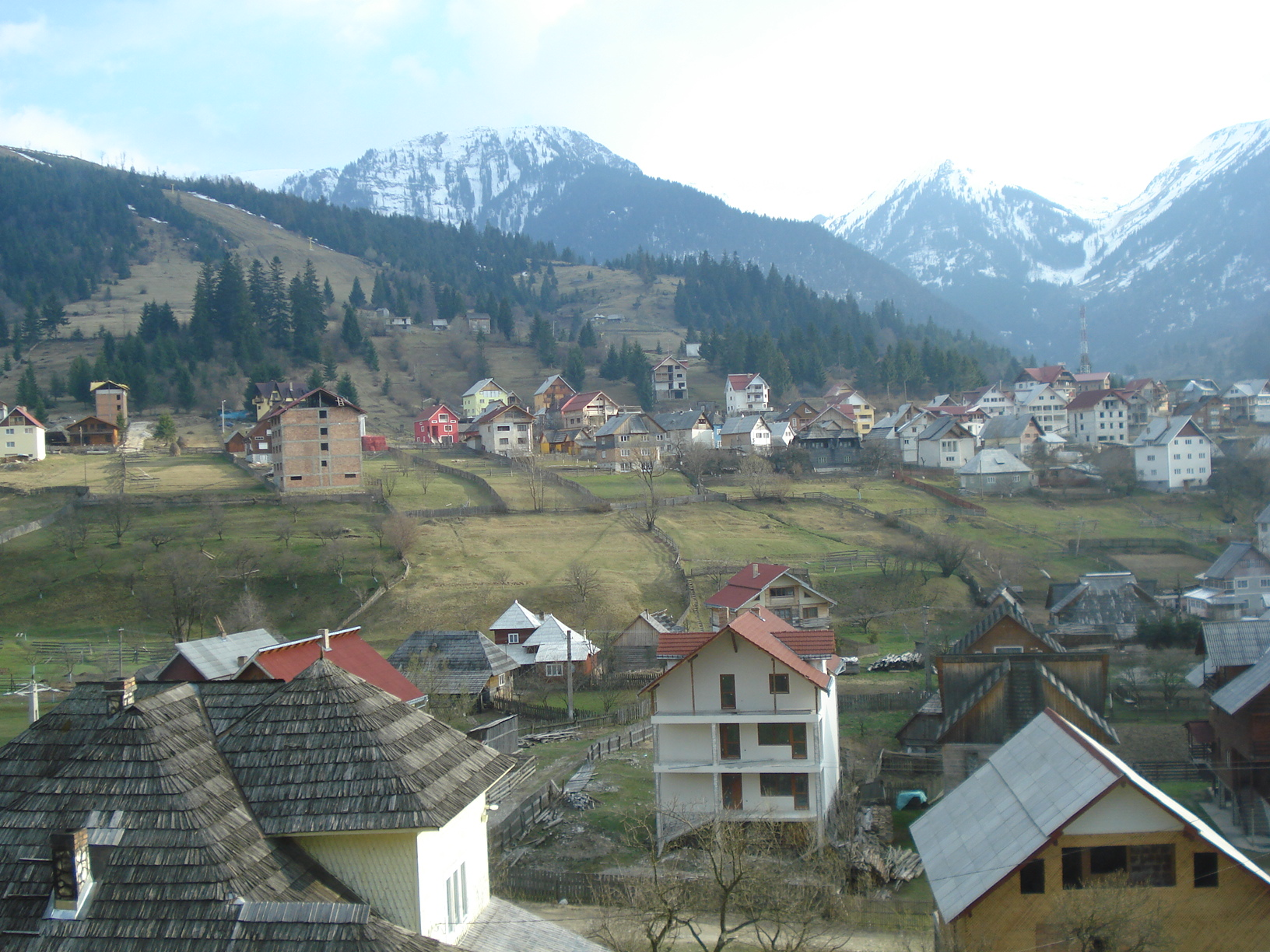
Houses in Borșa

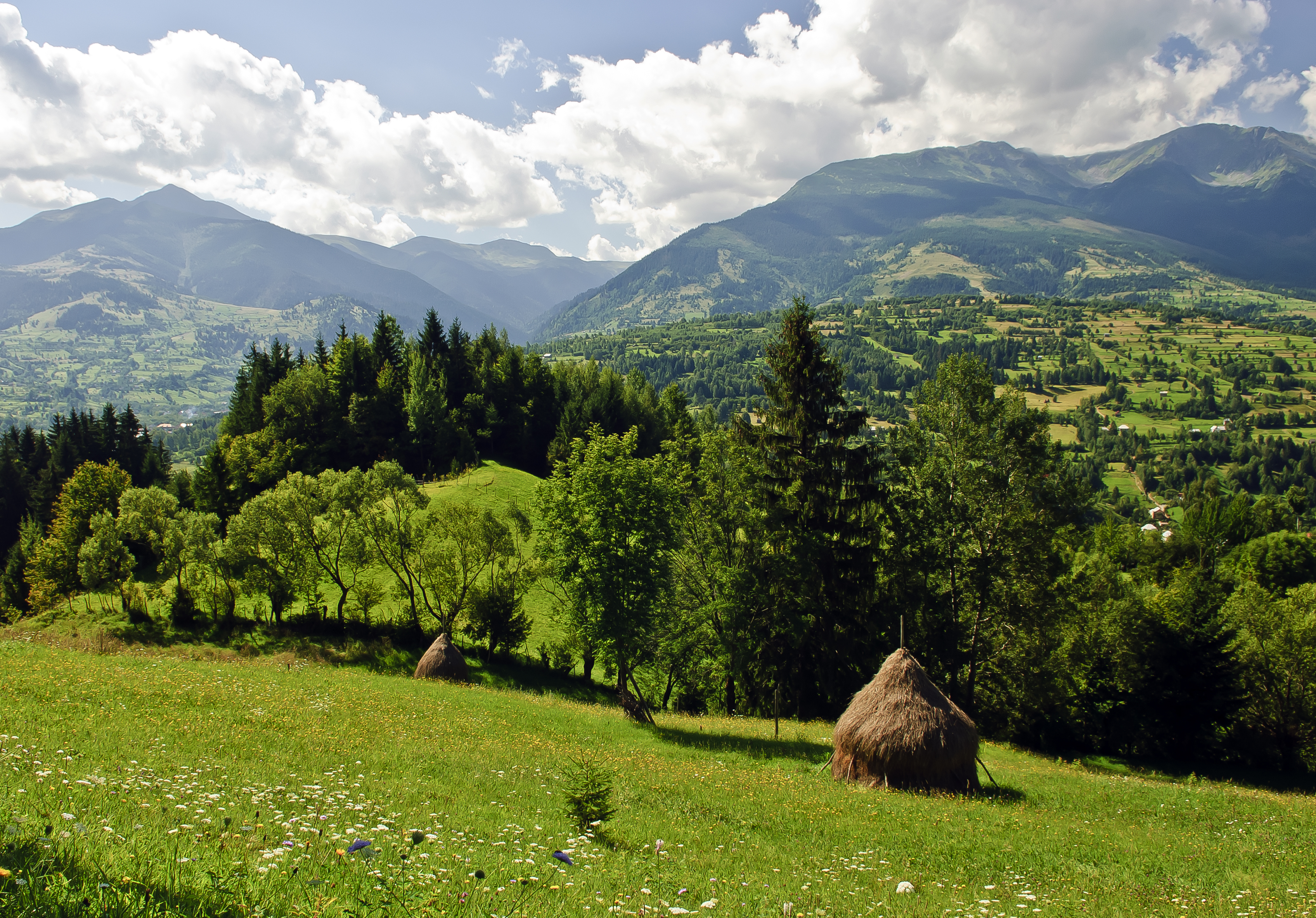
Pietrosu Mare near Borșa

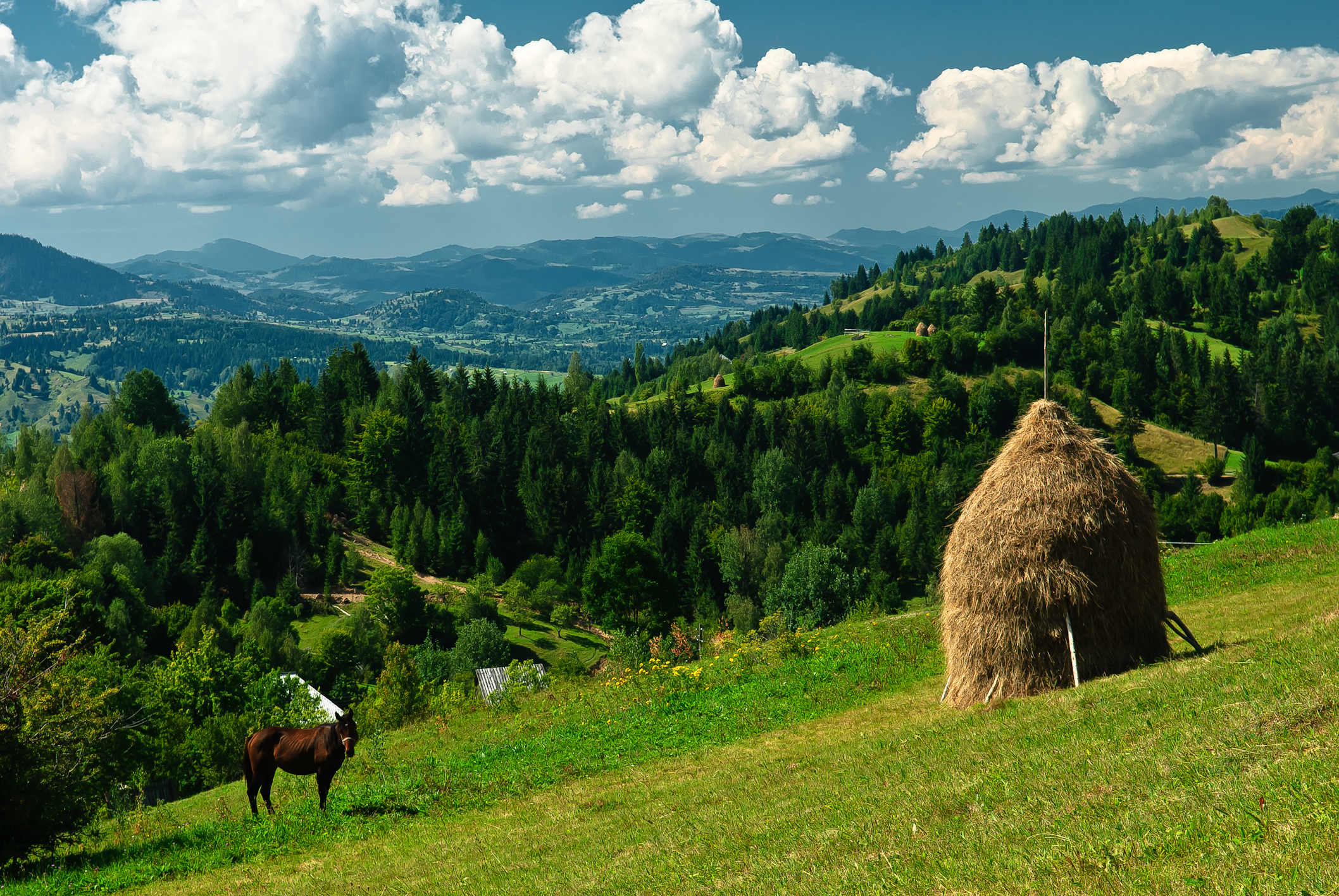
Mountainous landscape in Borșa with haystacks in the background

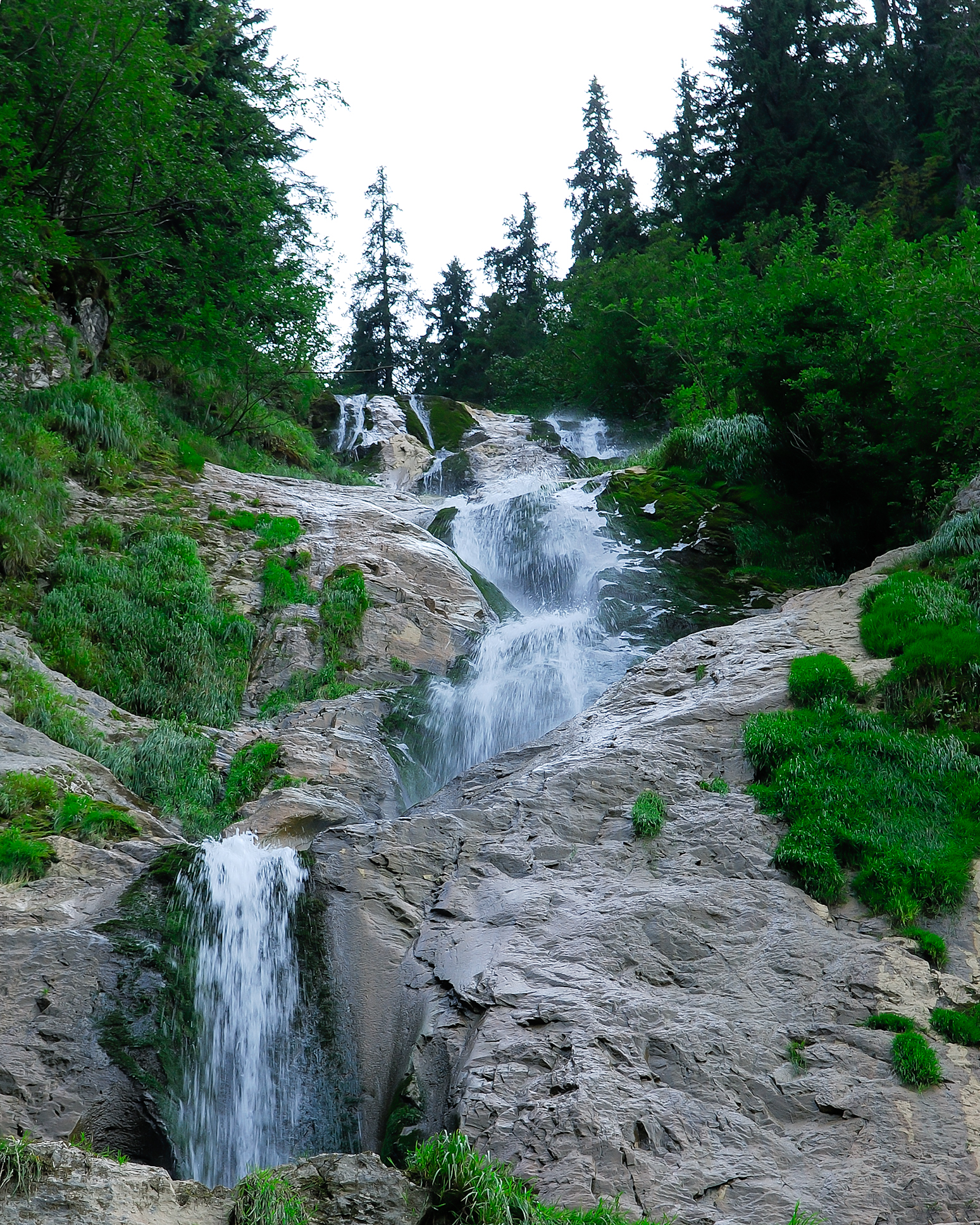
Horses' waterfall

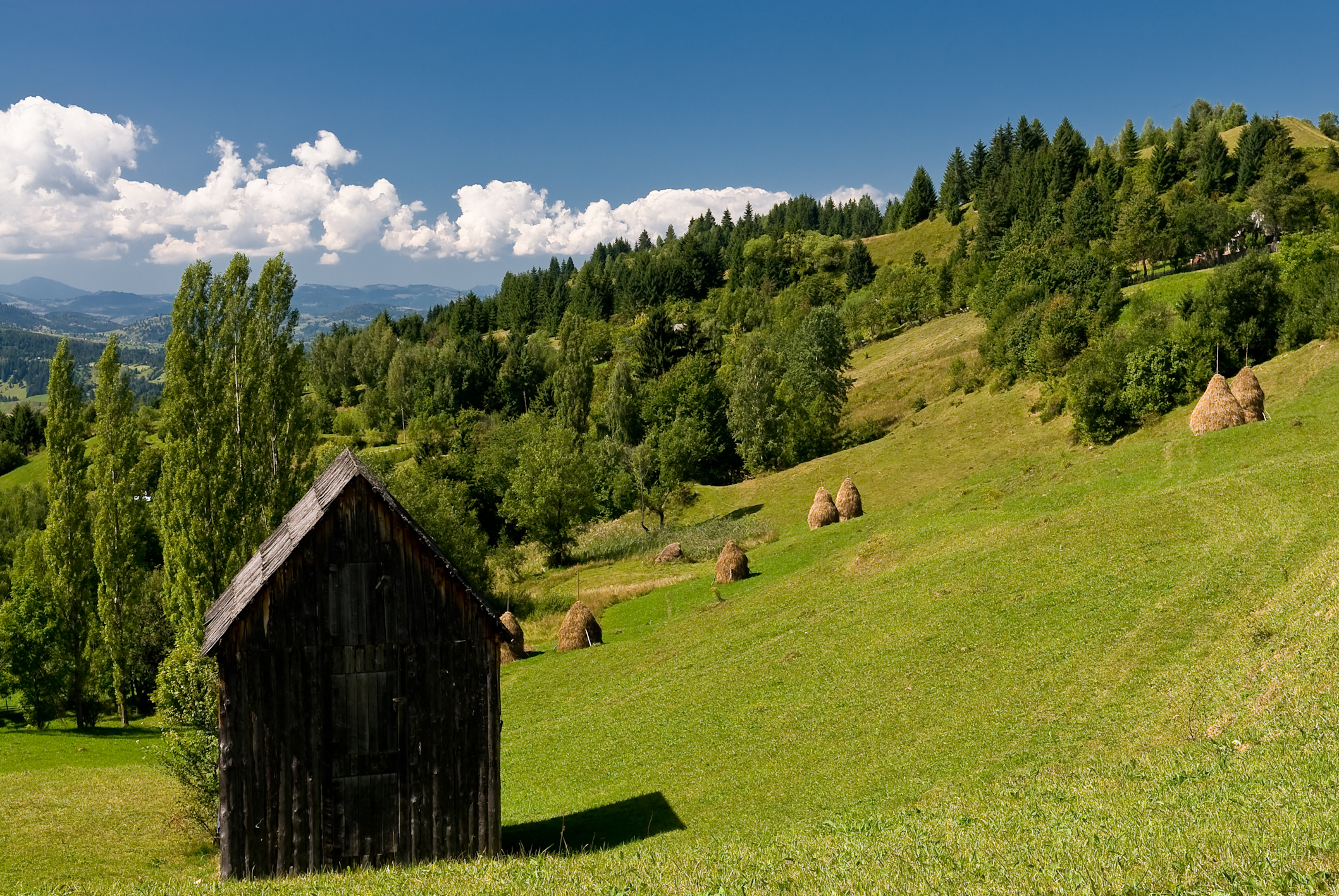
Traditional northern Romanian wooden church

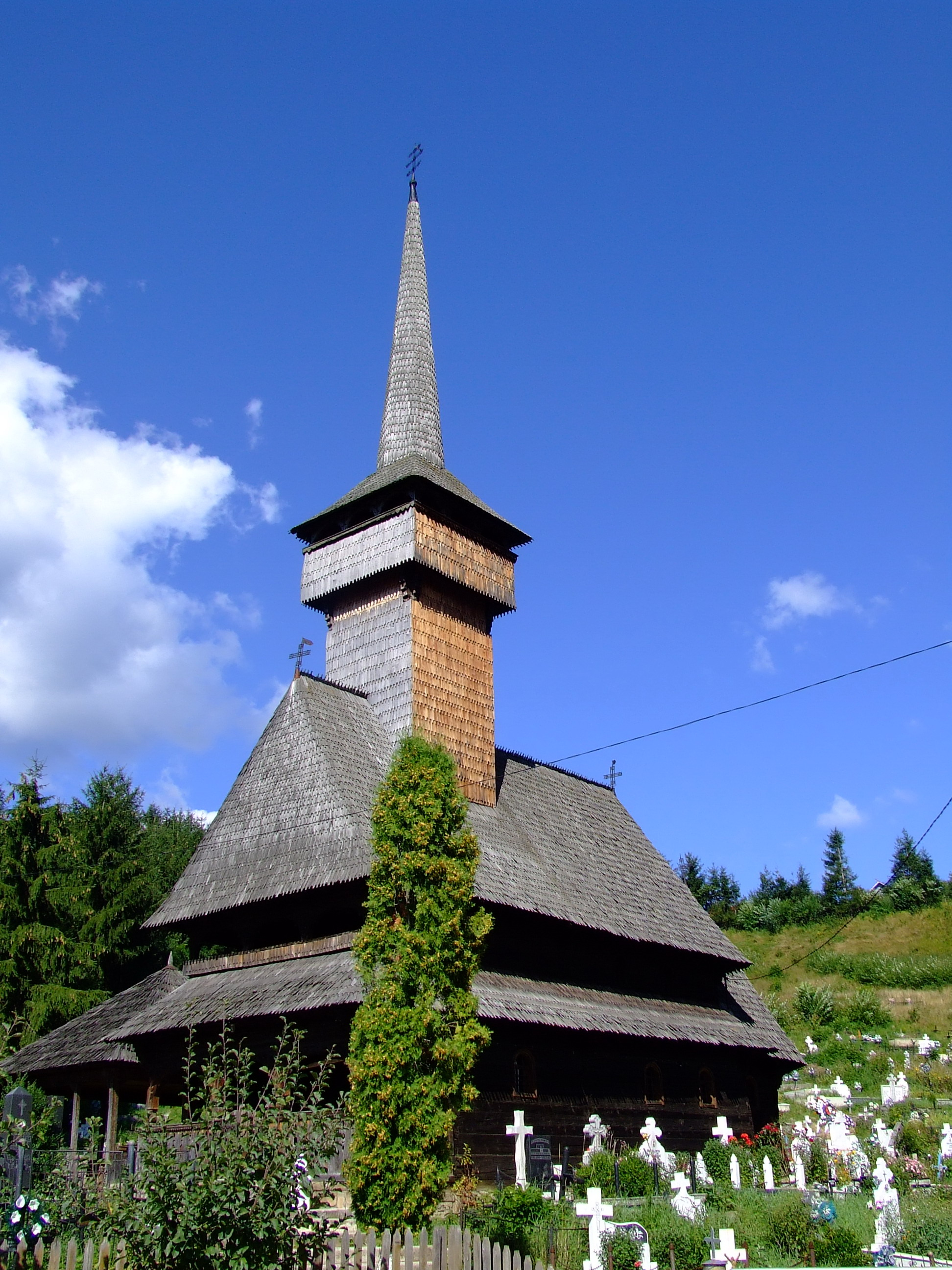
Wooden church in Borșa de Jos

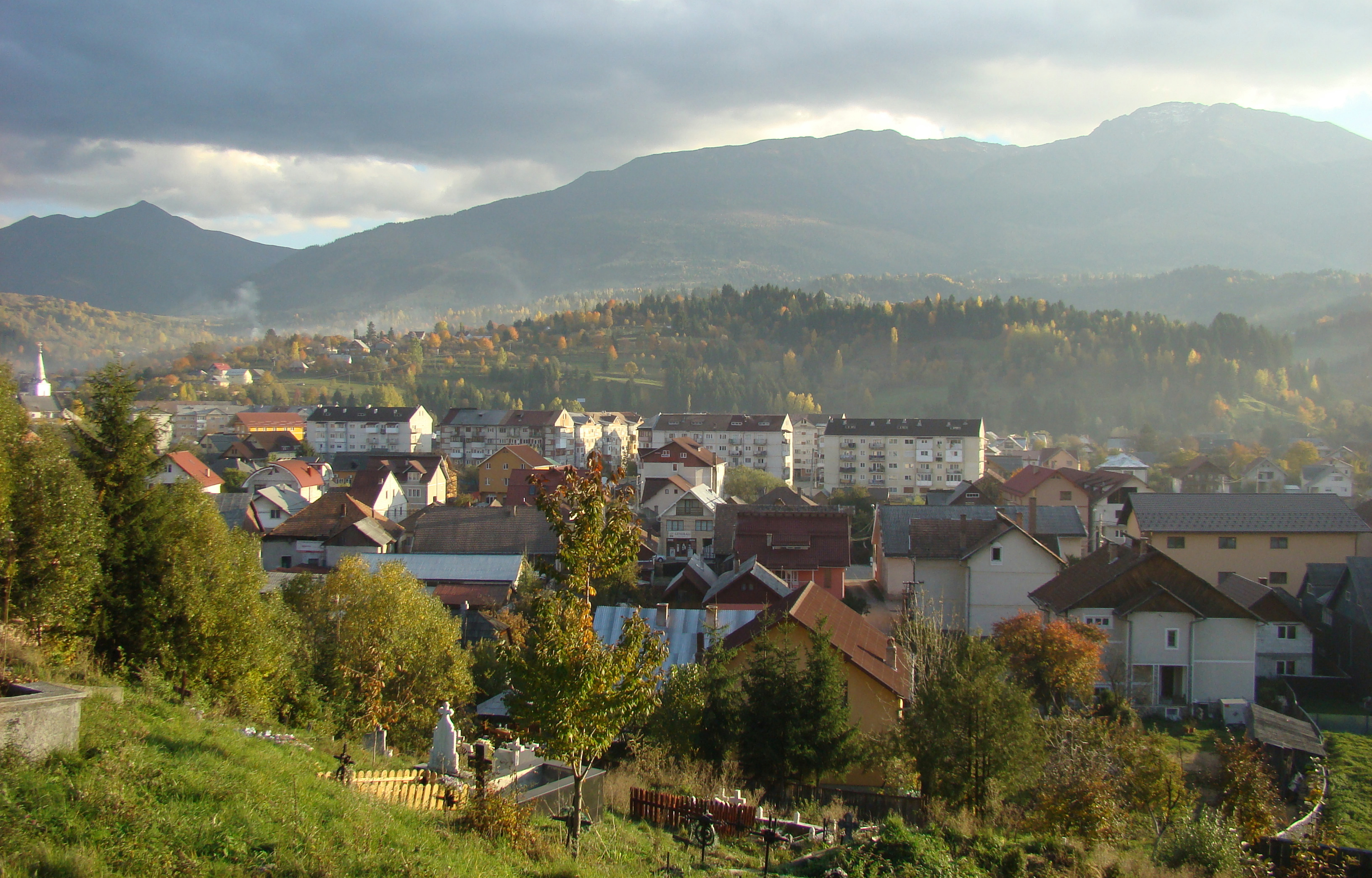
Panoramic view over Borșa

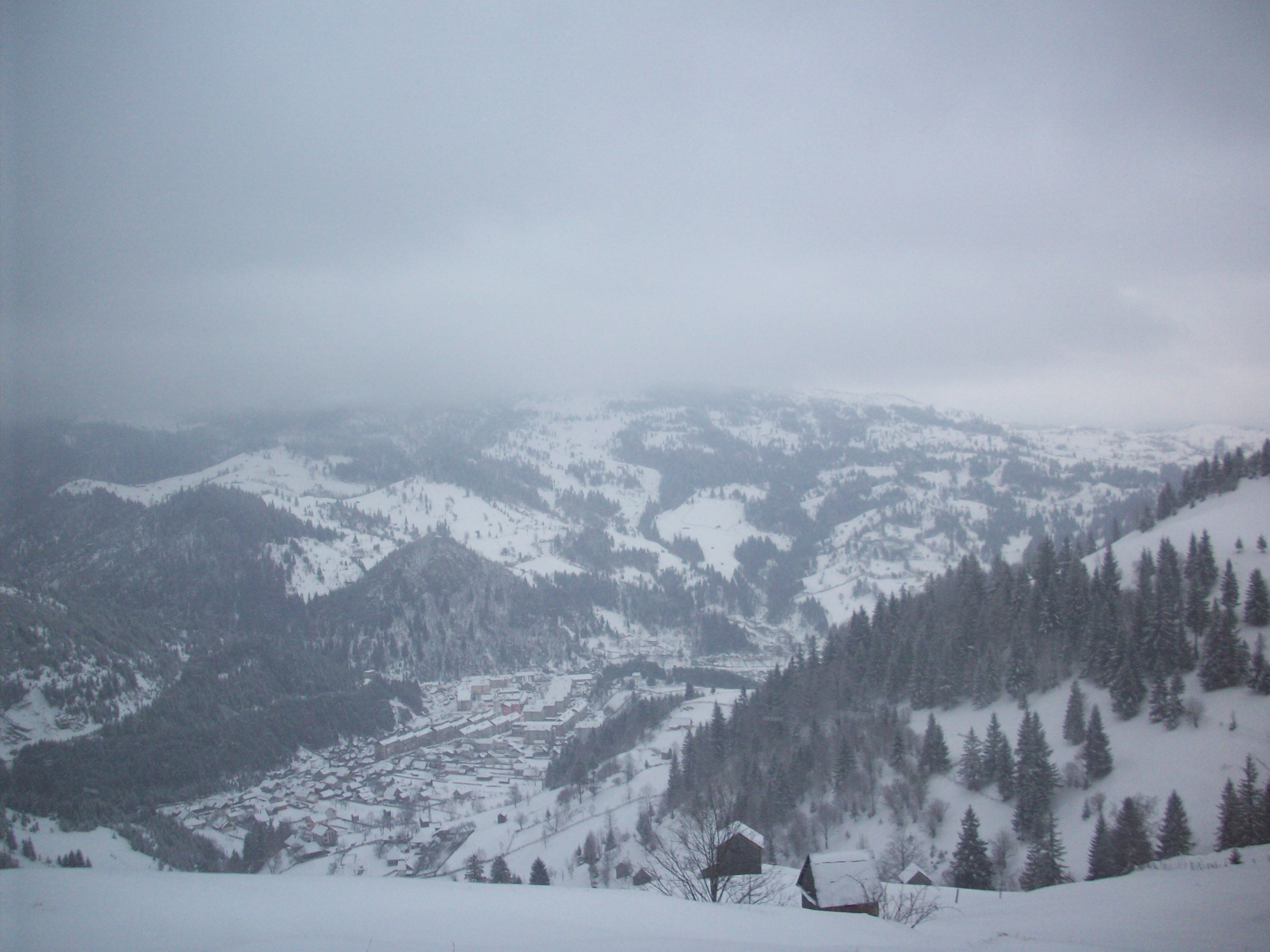
Panoramic view of Borșa in winter time

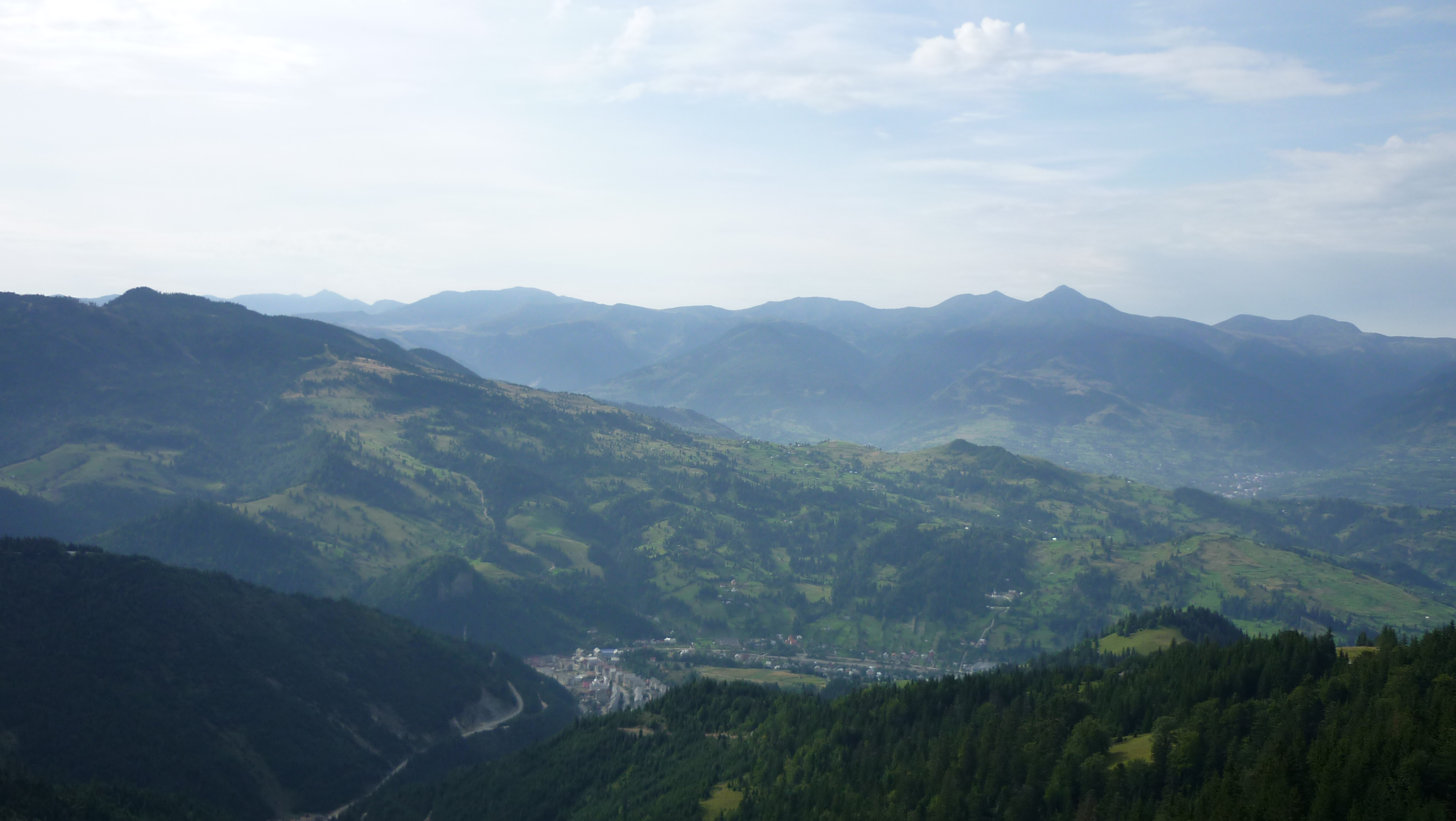
Băile Borșa viewed from Toroioaga Peak
