= Ronia =

Ronia may refer to:

== People ==
=== Given name ===
- Ronja (given name), also spelled as "Ronia"
- Ronia Tamar Goldberg (born 1950; stagename: Angelyne), American pop culture personality
- Ronia Bunjira, Zimbabwean politician; see Results of the 2013 Zimbabwean general election
- Ronia Metelski, Swiss weightlifter; see List of Swiss records in Olympic weightlifting

=== Surname ===
- Edward Jacob Ronia, Solomon Islander politician who in 2014 contested the East ꞌAreꞌare constituency
- Edward Ronia, Solomon Islander politician who participated in the 2008 East Honiara by-election

== Other uses ==
- Ronia, the Robber's Daughter (novel), a 1981 novel by Astrid Lindgren
- Ronia, the Robber's Daughter (film), a 1984 Swedish film, aka "Ronia"
- Ronia, the Robber's Daughter (anime), a 2010s Japanese animated TV show, aka "Ronia"
- Ronia, the titular character in the Ronia, the Robber's Daughter media franchise

== See also ==
- Ronnia
- Rona (disambiguation)
- Ronja (disambiguation)
- Ronya (disambiguation)
