= Ronya (disambiguation) =

Ronya may refer to:

- Ronja (given name), also spelled as "Ronya"
- Ronya (born 1991; Ronja Richardsdotter Gullichsen Stanley), Finno-British singer
- Lijum Ronya, an Indian politician
- Rônya (Japanese: ローニャ), the main character in the Japanese TV anime series Sanzoku no musume Rônya (Ronja, the Robber's Daughter)
- Ronya, a fictional character from the novel The Yeshiva

== See also ==
- Rona (disambiguation)
- Ronja (disambiguation)
- Ronia (disambiguation)
