= Ronnia =

Ronnia is a feminine given name.

== People with the given name ==
- Ronnia Durham-Balcombe, Saint Vincent and the Grenadines politician
- Ronnia Fornstedt (born 1990), Swedish model and beauty queen

== See also ==
- Ronia
- Ronna
- Ronnie
- Rhina
- Rhona
