= Rona de Jos =

- Commune
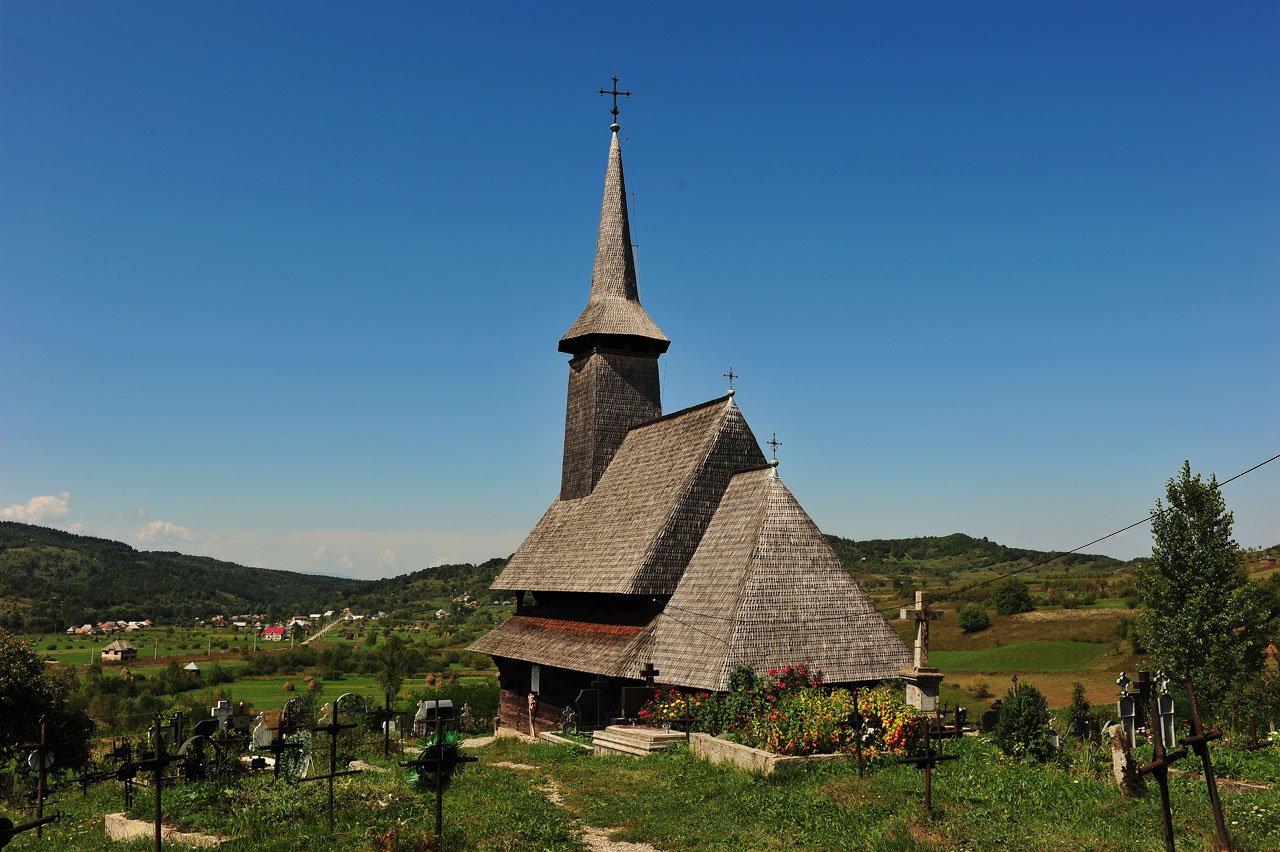
- Nativity of Mary wooden church

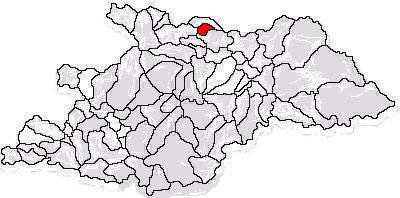
- Location in Maramureș County

- Location in Romania
- Coordinates: 47°55′N 24°1′E
- Country: Romania
- County: Maramureș

Government
  - Mayor (2020–2024): Ion Herbil (PSD)
- Area: 22.73 km^{2} (8.78 sq mi)
- Elevation: 330 m (1,080 ft)
- Population (2021-12-01): 1,928
  - Density: 84.82/km^{2} (219.7/sq mi)
- Time zone: UTC+02:00 (EET)
  - Summer (DST): UTC+03:00 (EEST)
- Postal code: 437245
- Area code: (+40) 02 62
- Vehicle reg.: MM
- Website: primariaronadejos.ro

Rona de Jos (Hungarian: Alsóróna, Yiddish: אונטר-רינה, romanized: Inter Rina) is a commune in Maramureș County, Maramureș, Romania. It is composed of a single village, Rona de Jos.

== Geography ==
The commune is located in a hilly area in the northern part of the county, 3 km (1.9 mi) from the river Tisza and the Ukrainian border. The river Rona, a right tributary of the Iza, flows through the commune. The nearest city is Sighetu Marmației, 8 km (5 mi) to the west; the county seat, Baia Mare, is 67 km (42 mi) to the southwest.

Rona de Jos is crossed by national road DN18, which starts in Baia Mare, runs through Sighetu Marmației and Borșa, and ends in Iacobeni, Suceava.

The commune neighbors the following localities: Crăciunești, Tisa, and Sighetu Marmației to the west and southwest, Vadu Izei and Valea Stejarului to the south, Lunca la Tisa and Valea Vișeului to the north, and Rona de Sus to the east.

== Demographics ==
Historical population
Year	Pop.	±%
1880	1,256	—
1900	1,856	+47.8%
1910	2,042	+10.0%
1930	2,746	+34.5%
1956	2,384	−13.2%
1977	2,612	+9.6%
1992	2,307	−11.7%
2002	2,110	−8.5%
2011	1,776	−15.8%
2021	1,928	+8.6%
Source: Census data

According to the 2021 census, Ronda de Jos has a population of 1,928, of which 93% are Romanians.

== Natives ==
- Ioan M. Bota (1920–2021), Greek-Catholic cleric, officer, and historian
