= Nancy McCampbell Grace =

Professor of English

- Born: January 31, 1952 (age 74)
- Occupation: Professor of English

Academic background
- Education: Ohio State University

Academic work
- Discipline: English Literature
- Institutions: College of Wooster
- Notable works: Breaking the Rule of Cool: Interviewing and Reading Beat Women Writers; Jack Kerouac and the Literary Imagination

Nancy McCampbell Grace (born January 31, 1952) is the Virginia Myers Professor of English at The College of Wooster in Wooster, Ohio, where she has taught since 1987. She is a specialist in the Beat Generation, with her research specifically on Jack Kerouac and women artists associated with the Beat movement.

== Education ==
Grace received her Bachelor of Arts in History from Otterbein College (now University) in Westerville, Ohio in 1973. She worked as a certified paralegal at the Institute for Paralegal Training in Philadelphia, Pennsylvania before going on to receive her Master of Arts from the Ohio State University in 1981. She received her Ph.D., also from Ohio State, in 1987 after completing her dissertation, "The Feminized Male Character in Twentieth-Century Literature."

== Professional accomplishments ==
Grace is known as an established U.S. authority on. She has also written on Interdisciplinarity and women's studies. Steven Belletto featured Grace in his article “Jack Kerouac, Sophistacte,” writing that Grace's work on Kerouac “demonstrated that the writing’s seemingly simple surfaces conceal much more complex formal structures and aesthetic theories. Raven J. See covered Grace’s Breaking the Rule of Cool in her article “Fashion and Female Beat Identity in the Writing of di Prima, Johnson, and Jones. See wrote, “As Ronna Johnson and Nancy Grace discuss in Breaking the Rule of Cool: ‘Women Beat writers dissented from gender assumptions of Beat and mainstream cultures; making their own use of the Beat aesthetics and culture by which they were colonized, they developed a subaltern's recourse, the art of being in between’ (21). As Johnson and Grace have illustrated, Beat women are a marginalized group within a marginalized subculture and they must doubly contend with the misogyny of the culture writ large but also within Bohemia.” In 2002, Grace and her research partner Ronna C. Johnson co-edited Girls Who Wore Black, which Isabel Castelao-Gómez referred to as “the first edited volume on Beat women writers with articles that bring academic emphasis on their two major genres: life and poetry.”

She is the co-editor of the Journal of Beat Studies published by Pace University Press, the co-editor of the Beat Studies book series published by Clemson University Press/Liverpool University Press, and a founding board member of the Beat Studies Association. She is married to Tom L. Milligan.

== Books ==
- Von Vogt, Liz. 681 Lexington Avenue: A Beat Education in New York City 1947-1954, edited and published by Nancy M. Grace. Greater Midwest Publishing, 2008. ISBN 1590983017
- Breaking the Rule of Cool: Interviewing and Reading Beat Women Writers, with Ronna C. Johnson. University Press of Mississippi, 2004.ISBN 1578066549
- The Feminized Male Character in Twentieth-Century Literature. Lewiston, New York: Edwin Mellen Press, 1995.ISBN 0773489983
- Girls Who Wore Black: Women Writing the Beat Generation, with Ronna C. Johnson. New Jersey: Rutgers University Press, 2002.ISBN 0813530652
- Jack Kerouac and the Literary Imagination. New York: Palgrave Macmillan, 2007. ISBN 1349734667
- Teaching Beat Generation Writers. New York: Modern Language Association, forthcoming.
- The Transnational Beat Generation. New York: Palgrave Macmillan, 2012. ISBN 0230108415

== Awards ==
- Winner of the Choice Top 100 Title in 2004 for Breaking the Rule of Cool and in 2007 for Jack Kerouac and the Literary Imagination
