= Elise Cowen =

American poet

- Elise Cowen (right) with Allen Ginsberg
- Born: Elise Nada Cowen; July 31, 1933; Washington Heights, Manhattan, New York, U.S.
- Died: February 27, 1962 (aged 28); Washington Heights, Manhattan, New York, U.S.
- Education: Barnard College
- Occupations: Poet, writer
- Writing career
- Literary movement: Beat literature

Elise Nada Cowen (July 31, 1933 – February 27, 1962) was an American poet. She was part of the Beat Generation, and was close to Allen Ginsberg, one of the movement's leading figures.

== Background ==
Born to a middle-class Jewish family in Washington Heights, New York, Cowen wrote poetry from a young age, influenced by the works of Emily Dickinson, T. S. Eliot, Ezra Pound, and Dylan Thomas.

While attending Barnard College in the early 1950s, she became friends with Joyce Johnson (at the time, Joyce Glassman). It was during this period that she was introduced to Ginsberg by psychology professor Donald Cook. The two discovered a mutual acquaintance in Carl Solomon, whom they had both met while spending time separately in a mental hospital. A romantic involvement followed in the spring and summer of 1953. However, within a year, Ginsberg would meet and fall in love with Peter Orlovsky, his eventual life partner. Despite this, Cowen remained emotionally attached to Ginsberg for the rest of her life. Until the publication of her posthumous collection, Elise Cowen: Poems and Fragments, Cowen was most famous for typing the final draft of "Kaddish" for Allen Ginsberg, after which she observed, "You still haven't finished with your mother." She discovered Jewish mysticism and Buddhism through Ginsberg, which influenced her poetry.

In February 1956, she and her lover Sheila (a pseudonym) moved into an apartment with Ginsberg and Orlovsky. At the time Cowen had a job as a typist. She was fired and was removed from the office by the police. She later told her close friend Leo Skir that one of the officers hit her in the stomach. When informed she had been arrested, her father said, "This will kill your mother." She then moved to San Francisco, attracted by its growing Beat scene. While in San Francisco, Cowen became pregnant and underwent a hysterotomy during a late-stage abortion. She returned to New York, and after another trip to California, she relocated to live in Manhattan.

== Death and posthumous publication ==
A lifelong depressive, Cowen began to be afflicted by increasingly severe psychological breakdowns, eventually being admitted to Bellevue Hospital in order to obtain treatment for hepatitis and psychosis. She checked herself out against doctors' orders and returned to her parents' apartment on Bennett Avenue under the guise that she was going to go on vacation with her parents to Miami Beach. At her parents' home she committed suicide, jumping through the locked living room window and falling seven stories to the ground.

A volume of work from her only surviving notebook, titled Elise Cowen: Poems and Fragments, edited by Tony Trigilio, was published in 2014 by Ahsahta Press. Fourteen of Cowen's shorter poems are included in the "Short Poem Dossier" of the 2012 issue of Court Green (edited by Trigilio and David Trinidad). These two publications represent the first time Cowen's work has been reprinted with the authorization of the copyright owners, her estate.

Elise Cowen: Poems and Fragments went out of print when Ahshata Press folded in 2020. A second edition, edited by Trigilio, was published in 2025 by BlazeVOX Books.

After her death, the bulk of her writings was destroyed by her parents' neighbors — as a favor to the parents, who were uneasy with Cowen's representations of sexuality and drug use in the poems. However, Leo Skir, a close friend, had 83 of her poems in his possession at the time of her death, and saw to the publication of several in prominent literary journals of the mid-1960s, including City Lights Journal; El Corno Emplumado; Fuck You, A Magazine of the Arts; The Ladder; and Things. A short biography and several of her poems are included in Women of the Beat Generation: Writers, Artists and Muses at the Heart of a Revolution, edited by Brenda Knight. Several of her poems also appear in A Different Beat: Writings by Women of the Beat Generation, edited by Richard Peabody. Cowen features prominently in Joyce Johnson's memoir, Minor Characters, and in Johnson's novel (as the character Kay), Come and Join the Dance.
