= Tony Trigilio =

American poet, editor, and scholar (born 1966)

Tony Trigilio (born 1966 in Erie, Pennsylvania) is an American poet, editor, and scholar. He is best known for his work with documentary poetics, popular culture, and autobiography, and for his innovative approaches to poetic form.

== Education ==
Trigilio earned a bachelor's degree from Kent State University in 1988, and a master's degree (1990) and Ph.D. (1997) from Northeastern University.

== Career ==
Trigilio has taught since 1999 at Columbia College Chicago, where he is a professor of English and Creative Writing. He directed Columbia College's M.F.A. program from 2006 to 2009 and from 2012 to 2015, and chaired the school's Creative Writing Department from 2015 to 2017.

He is the author and editor of eighteen books, including, among others, The Punishment Book (BlazeVOX [books], 2024), the fourth installment in his multivolume epic poem, The Complete Dark Shadows (of My Childhood); Craft: A Memoir (Marsh Hawk Press, 2023); The Beats and the Academy: A Renegotiation, co-edited with Erik Mortenson (Clemson University Press / Liverpool University Press, 2023); and Proof Something Happened, selected by Susan Howe as the winner of the Marsh Hawk Press Poetry Prize (Marsh Hawk, 2021). A volume of his selected poems, Fuera del Taller del Cosmos, was published in Guatemala in 2018 by Editorial Poe (translated by Bony Hernández).

His poems have been anthologized widely, most recently in The Best American Poetry (Scribner, 2023), The Eloquent Poem (Persea Books, 2019), The Golden Shovel Anthology: New Poems Honoring Gwendolyn Brooks (University of Arkansas Press, 2017), and Obsessions: Sestinas in the Twenty-First Century (Dartmouth College Press, 2014), among others.

Poet and scholar Joseph Harrington has praised Trigilio as “one of the most versatile writers in the U.S. today,” noting that Trigilio is “stretching not only poetry, but narrative as well. His books have various forms, voices and topics. You never know what he’ll do next.” Trigilio's innovative incorporation of historical research in his poems has made him a significant figure in contemporary documentary poetry. Reviewing his collection Historic Diary, Margaret Rozga argues that Trigilio's poems “insist that the unanswered questions of history haunt us long after the events are over.” In a review of Trigilio's collection Proof Something Happened, Jerome Sala notes that Trigilio's “Rashomon style” documentary poetics evokes “a sense of time travel: the documentarian style brings you back to the originary moments. You feel you are as close as possible to actual events.”

Trigilio has earned acclaim for his inventive work with popular culture, autobiography, and poetic form—most notably in his multivolume epic poem, The Complete Dark Shadows (of My Childhood). For this ongoing project begun in 2011, Trigilio is re-watching every episode of the 1960s gothic soap opera, Dark Shadows, which he saw every afternoon with his mother when he was a small child. He writes one sentence in response to each Dark Shadows episode, then shapes these sentences into poetry, prose, and hybrid forms, using each sentence as a conduit for autobiographical explorations. Maggie Millner has praised the project as Trigilio's “effort to face his demons, compose his memoirs, and keep alive the memory of his mother—all the while combining elements of kitsch, ekphrasis, and new formalism.” Joe Milazzo commends the project as a contemporary example of the Italian concept of sprezzatura, first coined in 1528 by Baldassare Castiglione in The Book of the Courtier and defined by Milazzo as the “nonchalant performance of virtuosity.” The fourth volume in the series, The Punishment Book, was published by BlazeVOX in 2024.

With Arielle Greenberg and David Trinidad, he co-founded the poetry magazine Court Green in 2004. From 2004 to 2015, Court Green was published in conjunction with Columbia College, and twelve issues of the magazine appeared during that time. In 2017, Trigilio and Trinidad revived Court Green as an independent online poetry journal. Aaron Smith joined Court Green as a co-editor in 2020.

Trigilio also has published a wide range of literary criticism and scholarship. He is the author of Allen Ginsberg's Buddhist Poetics (Southern Illinois University Press, 2012 [paperback]; 2007 [cloth]) and “Strange Prophecies Anew”: Rereading Apocalypse in Blake, H.D., and Ginsberg (Fairleigh Dickinson University Press, 2000). In 2014, he edited a posthumous collection of Elise Cowen’s work, Elise Cowen: Poems and Fragments (Ahsahta Press, 2014). The book fell out of print in 2020 when Ahsahta Press folded, a victim of budget cuts at its home institution, Boise State University. A new edition of Elise Cowen: Poems and Fragments was published by BlazeVOX [books] in 2025.

A past recipient of an Illinois Arts Council Fellowship in Poetry, he lives in Chicago.

== Published Works ==
=== Poetry ===
- The Lama’s English Lessons (2006), winner of the Three Candles Press First Book Award
- Make a Joke and I Will Sigh and You Will Laugh and I Will Cry (2008)
- With the Memory, Which is Enormous (2009)
- Historic Diary (2011)
- White Noise (2013)
- The Complete Dark Shadows (of My Childhood), Book 1 (2014)
- Inside the Walls of My Own House (2016)
- Ghosts of the Upper Floor (2019)
- Proof Something Happened (2021), winner of the Marsh Hawk Press Poetry Prize
- The Punishment Book (2024)
- Pay Per View (2026)

=== Creative Nonfiction ===
- Craft: A Memoir (2023)

=== Literary Criticism ===
- “Strange Prophecies Anew”: Rereading Apocalypse in Blake, H.D., and Ginsberg (2000)
- Allen Ginsberg's Buddhist Poetics (2012, paperback; 2007, cloth)

=== Edited ===
- Visions and Divisions: American Immigration Literature, 1870-1930 (co-edited with Tim Prchal, 2008)
- Dispatches from the Body Politic: Interviews with Jan Beatty, Meg Day, and Douglas Kearney (2016)
- The Beats and the Academy: A Renegotiation (co-edited with Erik Mortenson, 2023)
- Elise Cowen: Poems and Fragments (2025; first edition, 2014)
