= Iacobeni mine =

Mine in Romania

- Location within Romania
- Location: Iacobeni, Suceava County, Romania; 47°24′33.66″N 25°20′3.98″E (approximate)
- Products: Copper, Manganese
- Production: 70,000 tonnes of manganese
- Financial year: 2008
- Opened: 1782
- Company: Minbucovina

The Iacobeni mine is a large mine in the north of Romania in Suceava County, 96 km southwest of Suceava and 340 km north of the capital, Bucharest. Iacobeni represents the third largest copper reserve in Romania having estimated reserves of 200 million tonnes of ore grading 0.4% copper. The mine also has one of the largest manganese reserves in Romania estimated at 2.5 million tonnes of ore with an annual production of around 70,000 tonnes.
