= Rona =

Rona, RONA or Róna may refer to:

== Places ==
- Rona (Kristiansand), a neighbourhood in Kristiansand, Norway
- Rona (river), a river in Maramureș County, Romania
- Rona, Bellevue Hill, a historic house in the Sydney suburb of Bellevue Hill
- Rona, Switzerland, a village
- Rona, a village in Jibou town, Sălaj County, Romania
- Rona, a peninsula/island of the Isle of May in Scotland
- Rona de Jos and Rona de Sus, communes in Maramureș County, Romania
- North Rona, a Scottish island in the North Atlantic
- South Rona, a Scottish island in the Inner Hebrides
- Tinizong-Rona, a Swiss municipality

== People ==
=== In fiction and mythology ===
- Rona (Ojamajo Doremi), a fictional character in the Japanese anime series Ojamajo Doremi
- Rona, a minor character on the American television program Buffy the Vampire Slayer
- Rona, a legendary Maori woman who cursed the moon, whose legend is intertwined with that of the Myoporum laetum tree
- Rona, a character in the anime series Endro!

== Other uses ==
- Cyclone Rona, hit Australia in 1999
- Return on net assets, a measure of a company's performance
- Rona (1892), a New Zealand racing yacht
- Rona (store), an American-owned Canadian hardware and home improvement retailer
- Russkaya Osvoboditelnaya Narodnaya Armiya, or Russian People's Liberation Army, a collaborationist formation that fought for Nazi Germany
- A slang term for coronavirus, especially the one causing COVID-19

== See also ==
- Rhona
- Ronas Hill, the highest point of Mainland, Shetland
- Ronas Ryon (foaled 1984), an American Quarter Horse
- Ronay, a Scottish island in the Outer Hebrides
- Ronna, a given name
- "Rona Rona", a song by Guru Randhawa from Man of the Moon, 2022
- Corona (disambiguation)
