= Ronja =

Ronja may refer to:

- Ronia, the Robber's Daughter (Ronja Rövardotter), a children's book by Astrid Lindgren
- Reasonable Optical Near Joint Access, an optical point-to-point Free Space Optics data link
- Ronja (given name), the name Ronja.

== See also ==
- Ronya (disambiguation)
- Ronia (disambiguation)
