= Rhona =

Given name

Rhona is the name of:

- Rhona Adair (1878–1961), British golf champion
- Rhona Bennett (born 1976), American singer, actress and model
- Rhona Brankin (born 1950), Labour Co-operative politician and Member of the Scottish Parliament
- Rhona Brown (1922–2014), South African botanical artist and housewife
- Rhona Cameron (born 1965), Scottish comedian
- Rhona Charbonneau (1928–2017), American politician
  - Rhona (TV series), short-lived Scottish sitcom starring Cameron
- Rhona Goskirk, fictional character on ITV's Emmerdale
- Rhona Graff, senior vice-president of the Trump Organization
- Rhona Haszard (1901–1931), New Zealand artist
- Rhona Martin (born 1966), Scottish curler and skip of the Great Britain team
- Rhona McLeod, Scottish broadcaster
- Rhona Mitra (born 1976), British actress, model and singer
- Rhona Robertson (born 1970), New Zealand former badminton player
- Rhona Simpson (born 1972), Scottish field hockey player
- Rhona Smith, British legal academic

== See also ==
- Rona (disambiguation)
- Rhonda
