= Ranma =

Ranma may refer to:

- Ranma ½, a Japanese manga series
  - Ranma Saotome, the title character in the Ranma ½ media franchise
- Ranma (architectural), a type of transom found in traditional Japanese architecture

== See also ==
- Ramna Thana, a location in Bangladesh
- Ranna (disambiguation)
