= Ranna =

Ranna may refer to:

- Ranna, a subdivision of the town Auerbach in der Oberpfalz in Bavaria, Germany
- Ranna, Estonia, a village in the former municipality Pala Parish, Estonia
- Ranna (Danube), a river of Bavaria, Germany and of Upper Austria, tributary of the Danube
- Ranna Pumped Storage Power Station, a hydroelectricity power plant of Upper Austria located at lake Ranna
- Ranna (Kannada poet), one of the earliest poets of the Kannada language
- Ranna (film), a 2015 Indian Kannada family drama film
- Ranna the Sleeper, a Necromancer's Bell in the Old Kingdom series of books by Garth Nix, see The Bells (Old Kingdom)

== See also ==
- Ranma (disambiguation)
- Ronna, a given name
