= Door Wide Open =

2000 book by Joyce Johnson and Jack Kerouac

Door Wide Open: A Beat Love Affair In Letters, 1957-1958
- Author: Jack Kerouac & Joyce Johnson
- Cover artist: Wendy Lai
- Language: English
- Genre: Letters; Beat
- Publisher: Viking Press
- Publication date: June 1, 2000
- Publication place: United States
- Media type: Print (hardback & paperback)
- Pages: 182 pages
- ISBN: 978-0-670-89040-8
- OCLC: 42771995
- Dewey Decimal: 813/.54 B 21
- LC Class: PS3521.E735 Z485 2000

Door Wide Open: A Beat Love Affair In Letters, 1957-1958 is a collection of letters that were written in 1957-1958 between Joyce Johnson and Jack Kerouac. It was published in 2000 by Viking Press.

The letters depict the rather detached and absurd romance of the two writers, and they are supplemented greatly by Johnson's own narration and related letters between Joyce and her friends and relatives. Johnson is referred to in Kerouac's novel Desolation Angels as Alyce Newman, and she has written several introductions for his works.

The relationship between the two took place during a pivotal time period in Kerouac's life, when his fame was exploding after the release of On the Road.

Door Wide Open spans events from the couple's first meeting until after the romance had faded into friendship.
