= Ronna C. Johnson =

- Occupation: Professor of English

Academic background
- Education: Tufts University

Academic work
- Discipline: English Literature, Beat Generation Studies
- Institutions: Tufts University
- Notable works: “Girls Who Wore Black: Women Writing the Beat Generation,” “Breaking the Rule of Cool: Interviewing and Reading Beat Women Writers"

Ronna C. Johnson is a Professor of English at Tufts University in Medford, Massachusetts. Johnson is an established authority on the Beat Generation. She has worked as a fiction editor for ASPECT magazine, Zephyr Press, and Dark Horse magazine. She is also the co-editor of the Journal of Beat Studies published by Pace University Press, a founding board member of the Beat Studies Association, and the co-editor of the Beat Studies book series published by Clemson University Press/Liverpool University Press.

== Education ==
Johnson received her B.A. from Boston University College of Arts and Sciences, graduating magna cum laude. She then went on to receive her M.A. from the University of Michigan, Ann Arbor. She received her Ph.D. from Tufts University, and in 1984 was nominated for the University Microfilms International Distinguished Dissertation Award for her Doctoral Thesis, Jack Kerouac's Art: The Artist as Literary Hero in The Duluoz Legend.

== Awards and Grants ==
- Tufts Faculty Fellowship, Summer Award (1990)
- Tufts Deans and American Studies Department: Travel-research grant, Sinte Gleska College, Rosebud Sioux Reservation, Rosebud, SD (1989)
- Tufts Research Award for Lecturers (1985, 1986)

== Selected bibliography ==
=== Books ===
- Breaking the Rule of Cool: Interviewing and Reading Beat Women Writers, with Nancy M. Grace. University Press of Mississippi, 2004.ISBN 1578066549
- Girls Who Wore Black: Women Writing the Beat Generation, with Nancy M. Grace. New Jersey: Rutgers University Press, 2002.ISBN 0813530652

=== Articles ===
- “Three Generations of Beat Poetics.” Invited essay. The Cambridge Companion to American Poetry Post-1945. Edited by Jennifer Ashton. London: Cambridge UP. Forthcoming 2012.
- “Beat Transnationalism Under Gender: Brenda Frazer’s Troia: Mexican Memoirs.” The Transnational Beat Generation. Edited by Nancy Grace and Jennie Skerl. NY: Palgrave. January 2012.
- “Lenore Kandel’s The Love Book: Psychedelic Poetics, Cosmic Erotica, and Sexual Politics in the Midsixties Counterculture.” Reconstructing the Beats. Edited by Jennie Skerl. Palgrave/St. Martin's Press, 2004. 89-104.
- “Doctor Sax: The Origins of Vision in The Duluoz Legend.” Rpt. in The Beat Generation, edited by Allison Marion. Vol 3. Detroit, MI: The Gale Group, 2003. 117-123.
- “‘And Then She Went’: Beat Departures and Feminine Transgressions in Joyce Johnson's Come and Join the Dance. In Girls Who Wore Black: Women Writing the Beat Generation. Edited by Ronna C. Johnson and Nancy M. Grace. New Brunswick, NJ: Rutgers UP, 2002. 69-95. Rpt. in The Beat Generation, edited by Allison Marion. Vol. 3. Detroit, MI: The Gale Group, 2003. 11-23.
- "'You're Putting Me On': Jack Kerouac and the Postmodern Emergence," College Literature Special Issue 27, 1, Teaching Beat Literature. Edited by Jennie Skerl, Winter 2000. 22-38. Rpt. in The Beat Generation: Critical Essays. Edited by Kostas Myrsiades. Lang, 2002.
- "Said But Not Spoken: Elision and the Representation of Rape, Race and Gender in Harriet E. Wilson's Our Nig" in Speaking the Other Self: American Women Writers, edited by Jeanne Campbell Reesman, U Georgia P, 1997. 96-116.
- "John Okada's No-No Boy: Visions of Japanese Ethnic Identity and Revisions of 'Classic American' Literature." A Gathering of Voices on the Asian American Experience. Edited by Annette White- Parks et al. Ft. Atkinson, WI: Highsmith, 1994. 215-223.
- "An Introduction to Jack Kerouac's Art," Catching Up With Kerouac: The Literary Denim: A Journal of Beat Literature, 2, 1984, 22-30.
- "Doctor Sax: Origins of Vision in Kerouac's Duluoz Legend," The Review of Contemporary Fiction, 3, 2 (Summer 1983), 18-25.
