= Sport Nation =

- Sport Nation's current logo
- Presented by: Rhona McLeod; John Beattie; Katie Still
- Country of origin: Scotland

Production
- Running time: Varies

Original release
- Network: BBC Two Scotland
- Release: 22 March 2009 – 13 February 2019

Sport Nation is a magazine sports television programme produced by BBC Sport Scotland. The first edition was broadcast on BBC Two Scotland in March 2009 as Sport Monthly, but was relaunched as Sport Nation in 2011.

The programme is designed as a showcase for all levels of Scottish sport. Previous editions have also included interviews with some high-profile Scottish sportsmen and women in addition to popular and up-and-coming young sports stars. Features from each show are available to watch again on the show's website and the whole programme is available 7 days after transmission across the UK on the BBC iPlayer.

== Presenters ==
Reporters include Rhona McLeod, John Beattie, David Currie and Katie Still.

== See also ==
- BBC Scotland
- BBC Sport
