= Ronna =

Ronna is a feminine given name. People with that name include:

- Ronna Brott, Master with the Ontario Superior Court
- Ronna Burger (born 1947), American philosopher
- Ronna C. Johnson, American professor of English
- Ronna McDaniel (born 1973), American political operative
- Ronna Reeves (born 1968), American country music singer
- Ronna Rísquez, Venezuelan journalist
- Ronna Romney (born 1943), American Republican politician and radio talk show host

== Fictional people ==
- Ronna Beckman, a character in The West Wing

== See also ==
- ronna-, a metric prefix denoting a factor of 10^{27}
- Ronna and Beverly, characters created and embodied by actor/comedians Jessica Chaffin and Jamie Denbo
- Ronna-Rae Leonard (active from 2017), Canadian politician
- Ranna (disambiguation)
- HMT Rohna
- Roma (disambiguation)
- Rona (disambiguation)
