= Rhina =

Rhina may refer to:

- Rhina, Hesse, a village in Germany
- Rhina ancylostoma or bowmouth guitarfish, a species of ray
- Rhina Espaillat (born 1932), Dominican-American poet and translator
