= Rona (river) =

- Location within Romania

Location
- Country: Romania
- Counties: Maramureș County
- Villages: Rona de Sus, Rona de Jos, Sighetu Marmației

Physical characteristics
- Mouth: Iza
  - location: Sighetu Marmației
  - coordinates: 47°54′40″N 23°54′28″E
- Length: 23 km (14 mi)
- Basin size: 90 km^{2} (35 sq mi)

Basin features
- Progression: Iza→ Tisza→ Danube→ Black Sea
- Tributaries
  - left: Sărata

The Rona is a right tributary of the river Iza in Romania. It discharges into the Iza in Sighetu Marmației. Its length is 23 km (14 mi) and its basin size is 90 km^{2} (35 sq mi).
