= Rona de Sus =

Rona de Sus Bишня Рівня
- Commune
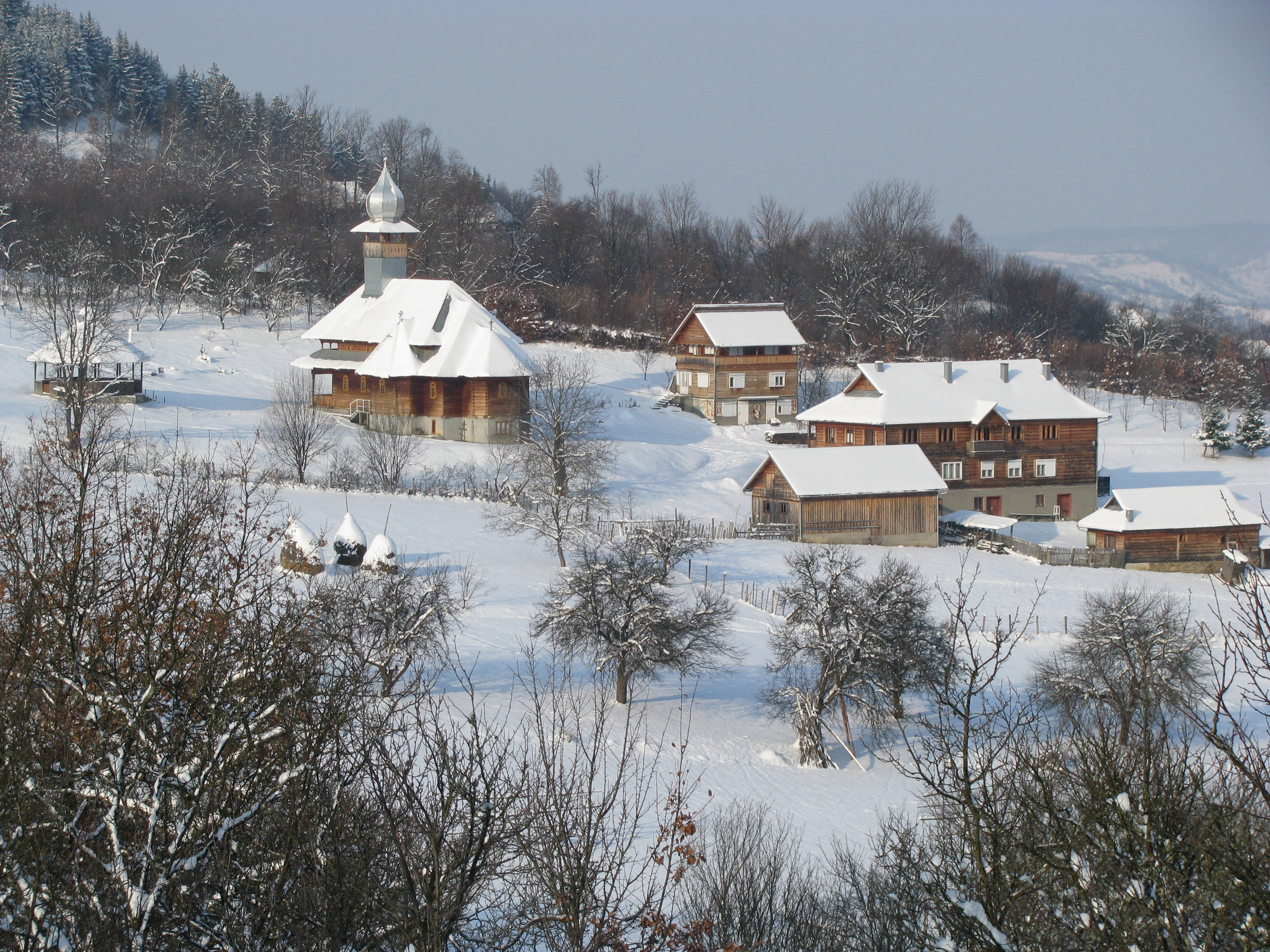
- Dormition of the Theotokos orthodox monastery in Rona de Sus

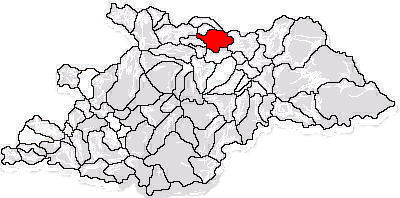
- Location in Maramureș County

- Location in Romania
- Coordinates: 47°54′N 24°3′E
- Country: Romania
- County: Maramureș

Government
  - Mayor (2020–2024): Alexa Semeniuc (USR)
- Area: 68.3 km^{2} (26.4 sq mi)
- Elevation: 331 m (1,086 ft)
- Population (2021-12-01): 4,171
  - Density: 61.1/km^{2} (158/sq mi)
- Time zone: UTC+02:00 (EET)
  - Summer (DST): UTC+03:00 (EEST)
- Postal code: 437250
- Area code: (+40) 02 62
- Vehicle reg.: MM
- Website: primariaronadesus.ro

Rona de Sus (Hungarian: Felsőróna; German: Oberrohnen; Ukrainian: Bишня Рівня; Rusyn: Вишня Руна, Yiddish: אויבר-רינה, romanized: Ober Rina) is a commune in Maramureș County, Maramureș, Romania. It is composed of two villages: Coștiui (Rónaszék; Rohnen; Коштіль) and Rona de Sus.

== Geography ==
The commune is located in a hilly area in the northern part of the county, about 6 km (3.7 mi) from the river Tisza and the Ukrainian border. The river Rona, a right tributary of the Iza, flows through the commune. The nearest city is Sighetu Marmației, 13 km (8.1 mi) to the northwest; the county seat, Baia Mare, is 70 km (43 mi) to the southwest. Rona de Sus is crossed by national road DN18, which starts in Baia Mare, runs through Sighetu Marmației and Borșa, and ends in Iacobeni, Suceava.

== Demographics ==
Historical population
Year	Pop.	±%
1880	3,387	—
1900	4,436	+31.0%
1910	4,631	+4.4%
1930	4,154	−10.3%
1956	4,331	+4.3%
1977	5,124	+18.3%
1992	4,982	−2.8%
2002	4,698	−5.7%
2011	3,855	−17.9%
2021	4,171	+8.2%
Source: Census data

At the 2021 census, Rona de Sus had a population of 4,171, of which 54.21% were Romanians, 34.6% Ukrainians, and 5.49% Hungarians. At the 2011 census, there were 3,855 inhabitants, of which 83.35% were Ukrainians, 8.12% Hungarians, and 5% Romanians. At the 2002 census, the commune had a population of 4,698, of which 72.9% were Ukrainian Orthodox, 10.8% stated they belonged to another religion, 8.6% were Roman Catholic, and 4.8% Greek-Catholic.

== Natives ==
- Nicolae-Miroslav Petrețchi (born 1985), politician, president of the Union of the Ukrainians of Romania party
