= Rhona McLeod =

Scottish broadcaster

Rhona McLeod is a Scottish broadcaster.

McLeod is a former international athlete and was a member of the Scottish Athletics team for seven years

== Athletics career ==
As an athlete, her preferred events included sprint hurdles and long jump. It was always her aim to combine her interest in sport with a future career in journalism.

== Media career ==
After a freshman year studying Broadcasting at the University of Wyoming, she completed a BA degree in Media Studies at the University of Stirling.

In her working career McLeod started out by writing for the specialist sports magazines Scotland's Runner, Scottish, The Punter football magazine and Today's Runner.

In 1995, she joined BBC Scotland. For 20 years she Presented the sport segment on Reporting Scotland. She also presented Sport Nation on television and Sport Weekly on BBC Radio Scotland.

In her time with BBC Scotland McLeod reported and presented from the France 98 World Cup, and Commonwealth Games in Kuala Lumpur, Manchester Melbourne Commonwealth Games, Glasgow 2014 and Gold Coast Commonwealth Games. She also presented sport from London 2012 Olympic Games.

For BBC One Scotland, McLeod wrote, presented and produced the documentary Gambian Goals - A Donkeymentary for a series of Make Poverty History programmes. She also produced and presented the first television interview with Philippa York for BBC Sport. She is the recipient of a Royal Television Society Award for Sports News journalism.

In May 2019 McLeod left BBC Scotland to form her own media company McLeod Media. Notable clients include World Athletics, Olympic Broadcasting Services, UK Athletics, Sportscotland, Scottish Rugby Union and Athletics Weekly amongst others. In this time she has reported and presented from 2020 Winter Youth Olympics in Lausanne, World Athletics Relays in Poland, Tokyo Olympics 2020 and the World Athletics Indoor Championships 2022 in Belgrade.

Her hobbies include walking her dog Archie, painting, watching and playing sport.

She married Bruce Cook, from Fargo, North Dakota, in Hawaii in January 2002, after 14 months of transatlantic dating. The couple have two daughters, born in October 2002 and November 2003. They live in the Stirlingshire village of Balfron.
