= List of Swiss records in Olympic weightlifting =

The following are the national records in Olympic weightlifting in Switzerland. Records are maintained in each weight class for the snatch lift, clean and jerk lift, and the total for both lifts by the Swiss Amateur Weightlifting Federation (Schweizerischer Amateur Gewichtheber Verband / Fédération Suisse d'Haltérophilie Amateur).

== Current records ==
Awaiting ratification Not ratified or later rescinded by SAGV-FSHA

=== Men ===
Event	Record	Athlete	Date	Meet	Place	Ref
60 kg
Snatch	88 kg	Samuel Geringer	25 October 2025	Challenge 210	Tramelan, Switzerland	
Clean & Jerk	107 kg	Samuel Geringer	25 October 2025	Challenge 210	Tramelan, Switzerland	
Total	195 kg	Samuel Geringer	25 October 2025	Challenge 210	Tramelan, Switzerland	
65 kg
Snatch	98 kg	Samuel Geringer	16 May 2026	Swiss Team Championships Playoffs Final	Biel/Bienne, Switzerland	
Clean & Jerk	122 kg	Samuel Geringer	16 May 2026	Swiss Team Championships Playoffs Final	Biel/Bienne, Switzerland	
Total	220 kg	Samuel Geringer	16 May 2026	Swiss Team Championships Playoffs Final	Biel/Bienne, Switzerland	
70 kg
Snatch	121 kg	Standard				
Clean & Jerk	142 kg	Standard				
Total	255 kg	Standard				
75 kg
Snatch	124 kg	Standard				
Clean & Jerk	150 kg	Standard				
Total	272 kg	Standard				
85 kg
Snatch	128 kg	Standard				
Clean & Jerk	158 kg	Standard				
Total	282 kg	Standard				
95 kg
Snatch	147 kg	Standard				
Clean & Jerk	182 kg	Standard				
Total	326 kg	Standard				
110 kg
Snatch	149 kg	Yannick Tschan	29 March 2026			
Clean & Jerk	188 kg	Yannick Tschan	29 March 2026			
Total	337 kg	Yannick Tschan	29 March 2026			
+110 kg
Snatch	153 kg	Standard				
Clean & Jerk	186 kg	Standard				
Total	339 kg	Standard				

=== Women ===
Event	Record	Athlete	Date	Meet	Place	Ref
49 kg
Snatch	61 kg	Standard				
Clean & Jerk	77 kg	Standard				
Total	142 kg	Standard				
53 kg
Snatch	79 kg	Standard				
Clean & Jerk	97 kg	Standard				
Total	176 kg	Standard				
57 kg
Snatch	82 kg	Standard				
Clean & Jerk	101 kg	Standard				
Total	180 kg	Standard				
61 kg
Snatch	82 kg	Standard				
Clean & Jerk	102 kg	Standard				
Total	185 kg	Standard				
69 kg
Snatch	85 kg	Mirjam von Rohr	15 November 2025			
Clean & Jerk	112 kg	Mirjam von Rohr	1 November 2025	European U23 Championships	Durrës, Albania	
Total	196 kg	Mirjam von Rohr	1 November 2025	European U23 Championships	Durrës, Albania	
77 kg
Snatch	86 kg	Standard				
Clean & Jerk	106 kg	Standard				
Total	192 kg	Standard				
86 kg
Snatch	90 kg	Tara Beckford	29 March 2026			
Clean & Jerk	111 kg	Tara Beckford	29 March 2026			
Total	201 kg	Tara Beckford	29 March 2026			
+86 kg
Snatch	94 kg	Standard				
Clean & Jerk	120 kg	Standard				
Total	213 kg	Standard				

== Historical records ==
=== Men (2025–2026) ===
Event	Record	Athlete	Date	Meet	Place	Ref
71 kg
Snatch	123 kg	Standard				
Clean & Jerk	144 kg	Standard				
Total	259 kg	Standard				
79 kg
Snatch	132 kg	Jonas Aufdenblatten	16 May 2026	Swiss Team Championships Playoffs Final	Biel/Bienne, Switzerland	
Clean & Jerk	160 kg	Jonas Aufdenblatten	2 May 2026	Swiss Team Championships Playoffs Semi-Final	Biel/Bienne, Switzerland	
Total	292 kg	Jonas Aufdenblatten	16 May 2026	Swiss Team Championships Playoffs Final	Biel/Bienne, Switzerland	
88 kg
Snatch	130 kg	Standard				
Clean & Jerk	161 kg	Standard				
Total	286 kg	Standard				
94 kg
Snatch	148 kg	Yannick Tschan	24 April 2026	European Championships	Batumi, Georgia	
Clean & Jerk	185 kg	Yannick Tschan	24 April 2026	European Championships	Batumi, Georgia	
Total	333 kg	Yannick Tschan	24 April 2026	European Championships	Batumi, Georgia	

=== Men (2018–2025) ===
Event	Record	Athlete	Date	Meet	Place	Ref
55 kg
Snatch	75 kg	Standard				
Clean & Jerk	92 kg	Standard				
Total	167 kg	Standard				
61 kg
Snatch	82 kg	Luca Bützberger	11 May 2024	Swiss Junior Championships	Tramelan, Switzerland	
Clean & Jerk	110 kg	Standard				
Total	190 kg	Standard				
67 kg
Snatch	104 kg	Kok Sue Huynh	28 October 2023	Challenge 210	Tramelan, Switzerland	
Clean & Jerk	124 kg	Kok Sue Huynh	28 August 2021	Swiss Championships	Basel, Switzerland	
Total	224 kg	Kok Sue Huynh	28 October 2023	Challenge 210	Tramelan, Switzerland	
73 kg
Snatch	130 kg	Titouan Verloes	12 November 2023		Rorschach, Switzerland	
Clean & Jerk	152 kg	Jonas Aufdenblatten	15 February 2024	European Championships	Sofia, Bulgaria	
Total	274 kg	Jonas Aufdenblatten	15 February 2024	European Championships	Sofia, Bulgaria	
81 kg
Snatch	132 kg	Jonas Aufdenblatten	26 October 2024	Challenge 210	Tramelan, Switzerland	
Clean & Jerk	161 kg	Jonas Aufdenblatten				
Total	290 kg	Jonas Aufdenblatten	16 June 2024	Swiss Championships	Wil, Switzerland	
89 kg
Snatch	133 kg	Tom Schwander	10 June 2023	Swiss Championships	La Chaux-de-Fonds, Switzerland	
Clean & Jerk	165 kg	Amos Ferrari	25 September 2022		Staad, Switzerland	
Total	293 kg	Amos Ferrari	25 September 2022		Staad, Switzerland	
96 kg
Snatch	151 kg	Yannick Tschan	19 April 2025	European Championships	Chișinău, Moldova	
Clean & Jerk	188 kg	Yannick Tschan	12 December 2024	World Championships	Manama, Bahrain	
Total	337 kg	Yannick Tschan	12 December 2024	World Championships	Manama, Bahrain	
102 kg
Snatch	152 kg	Yannick Tschan	3 May 2025	Swiss Cup	Bienne, Switzerland	
Clean & Jerk	188 kg	Yannick Tschan	3 May 2025	Swiss Cup	Bienne, Switzerland	
Total	340 kg	Yannick Tschan	3 May 2025	Swiss Cup	Bienne, Switzerland	
109 kg
Snatch	145 kg	Standard				
Clean & Jerk	175 kg	Standard				
Total	320 kg	Standard				
+109 kg
Snatch	150 kg	Standard				
Clean & Jerk	183 kg	Standard				
Total	333 kg	Standard				

=== Men (1998–2018) ===
Event	Record	Athlete	Date	Meet	Place	Ref
–56 kg
Snatch	80 kg	Peter Lieberherr	12 February 2000		Wattwil, Switzerland	
Clean & Jerk	95 kg	Peter Lieberherr	12 February 2000		Wattwil, Switzerland	
Total	175 kg	Peter Lieberherr	12 February 2000		Wattwil, Switzerland	
–62 kg
Snatch	92 kg	Kok Sue Huynh	13 October 2018		Moutier, Switzerland	
Clean & Jerk	114 kg	Kok Sue Huynh	13 October 2018		Moutier, Switzerland	
Total	206 kg	Kok Sue Huynh	13 October 2018		Moutier, Switzerland	
–69 kg
Snatch	112.5 kg	Cédric Jourdain	12 May 2001		Fribourg, Switzerland	
Clean & Jerk	130 kg	Cédric Jourdain	25 April 2002	European Championships	Antalya, Turkey	
Total	240 kg	Cédric Jourdain	25 April 2002	European Championships	Antalya, Turkey	
–77 kg
Snatch	132.5 kg	Dimitri Lab	31 October 1998		Tramelan, Switzerland	
Clean & Jerk	157.5 kg	Redjean Clerc	24 November 1999	World Championships	Athens, Greece	
Total	287.5 kg	Dimitri Lab	26 September 1998		Wattwil, Switzerland	
–85 kg
Snatch	137 kg	Yannick Sautebin	26 April 2014		La Chaux-de-Fonds, Switzerland	
Clean & Jerk	175.5 kg	Eric Palissot	9 December 2000		Saint-Marcellin, France	
Total	305 kg	Eric Palissot	4 March 2000		Besançon, France	
–94 kg
Snatch	140 kg	Janos Nemeshazy	26 June 1999		La Chaux-de-Fonds, Switzerland	
Clean & Jerk	180 kg	Janos Nemeshazy	13 November 1999	Challenge 210	Tramelan, Switzerland	
Total	310 kg	Janos Nemeshazy	11 September 1999		La Chaux-de-Fonds, Switzerland	
–105 kg
Snatch	155 kg	Janos Nemeshazy	9 November 2001	World Championships	Antalya, Turkey	
Clean & Jerk	192.5 kg	Janos Nemeshazy	12 May 2001		Fribourg, Switzerland	
Total	347.5 kg	Janos Nemeshazy	9 November 2001	World Championships	Antalya, Turkey	
+105 kg
Snatch	141 kg	Luis Lopez Bedoya	28 October 2017	Challenge 210	Tramelan, Switzerland	
Clean & Jerk	164 kg	Luis Lopez Bedoya	28 October 2017	Challenge 210	Tramelan, Switzerland	
Total	305 kg	Luis Lopez Bedoya	28 October 2017	Challenge 210	Tramelan, Switzerland	

=== Women (2025–2026) ===
Event	Record	Athlete	Date	Meet	Place	Ref
48 kg
Snatch	52 kg	Standard				
Clean & Jerk	70 kg	Standard				
Total	120 kg	Standard				
58 kg
Snatch	83 kg	Standard				
Clean & Jerk	103 kg	Standard				
Total	183 kg	Standard				
63 kg
Snatch	83 kg	Standard				
Clean & Jerk	105 kg	Standard				
Total	185 kg	Standard				

=== Women (2018–2025) ===
Event	Record	Athlete	Date	Meet	Place	Ref
45 kg
Snatch	49 kg	Alyssa Briand	11 May 2024	Swiss Junior Championships	Tramelan, Switzerland	
Clean & Jerk	60 kg	Sabine von Salis	18 November 2023		Basel, Switzerland	
Total	105 kg	Sabine von Salis	18 November 2023		Basel, Switzerland	
49 kg
Snatch	54 kg	Caroline Pellaton	28 August 2021	Swiss Championships	Basel, Switzerland	
Clean & Jerk	73 kg	Caroline Pellaton	12 February 2022		Tramelan, Switzerland	
Total	125 kg	Caroline Pellaton	28 August 2021	Swiss Championships	Basel, Switzerland	
55 kg
Snatch	85 kg	Scheila Meister	17 April 2023	European Championships	Yerevan, Armenia	
Clean & Jerk	104 kg	Scheila Meister	17 April 2023	European Championships	Yerevan, Armenia	
Clean & Jerk	104 kg	Scheila Meister	29 May 2022	European Championships	Tirana, Albania	
Total	189 kg	Scheila Meister	17 April 2023	European Championships	Yerevan, Armenia	
59 kg
Snatch	86 kg	Scheila Meister	18 June 2022	Swiss Championships	Basel, Switzerland	
Clean & Jerk	107 kg	Scheila Meister	1 July 2022	International Women's Grand Prix	Dudelange, Luxembourg	
Total	189 kg	Scheila Meister	13 November 2021		Andelfingen, Switzerland	
64 kg
Snatch	86 kg	Tanja Schmid	12 November 2023		Rorschach, Switzerland	
Clean & Jerk	108 kg	Tanja Schmid	12 November 2023		Rorschach, Switzerland	
Total	194 kg	Tanja Schmid	12 November 2023		Rorschach, Switzerland	
71 kg
Snatch	87 kg	Catherine Andrey	15 June 2024	Swiss Championships	Wil, Switzerland	
Clean & Jerk	117 kg	Mirjam von Rohr	1 February 2025			
Total	200 kg	Mirjam von Rohr	17 April 2025	European Championships	Chișinău, Moldova	
76 kg
Snatch	94 kg	Nora Jäggi	7 September 2019	Swiss Championships	Moutier, Switzerland	
Snatch	95 kg	Nora Jäggi	30 January 2020	World Cup	Rome, Italy	
Clean & Jerk	120 kg	Nora Jäggi	27 April 2019		St. Gallen, Switzerland	
Total	213 kg	Nora Jäggi	25 October 2019	Challenge 210	Tramelan, Switzerland	
81 kg
Snatch	89 kg	Angela Wyss	6 July 2024		Marston Green, Great Britain	
Clean & Jerk	110 kg	Angela Wyss	3 May 2025	Swiss Cup	Bienne, Switzerland	
Total	195 kg	Angela Wyss	3 May 2025	Swiss Cup	Bienne, Switzerland	
87 kg
Snatch	88 kg	Standard				
Clean & Jerk	108 kg	Standard				
Total	196 kg	Standard				
+87 kg
Snatch	93 kg	Standard				
Clean & Jerk	115 kg	Standard				
Total	208 kg	Standard				

=== Women (1998–2018) ===
Event	Record	Athlete	Date	Meet	Place	Ref
–48 kg
Snatch	38 kg	Anuk Rahel Fringeli	16 June 2018		Basel, Switzerland	
Clean & Jerk	47 kg	Anuk Rahel Fringeli	16 June 2018		Basel, Switzerland	
Total	85 kg	Anuk Rahel Fringeli	16 June 2018		Basel, Switzerland	
–53 kg
Snatch	65 kg	Jessica Preiss	28 October 2017	Challenge 210	Tramelan, Switzerland	
Clean & Jerk	77 kg	Jessica Preiss	20 May 2017		Tramelan, Switzerland	
Total	140 kg	Jessica Preiss	20 May 2017		Tramelan, Switzerland	
–58 kg
Snatch	70 kg	Agnes Polgar	15 September 2018		St. Gallen, Switzerland	
Clean & Jerk	90 kg	Agnes Polgar	13 October 2018		Basel, Switzerland	
Total	159 kg	Agnes Polgar	15 September 2018		St. Gallen, Switzerland	
–63 kg
Snatch	78 kg	Alessia Wälchli	1 July 2017		Rorschach, Switzerland	
Clean & Jerk	97 kg	Alessia Wälchli	22 August 2017	Universiade	New Taipei City, Taiwan	
Total	174 kg	Alessia Wälchli	1 July 2017		Rorschach, Switzerland	
–69 kg
Snatch	86 kg	Nora Jäggi	30 March 2018	European Championships	Bucharest, Romania	
Clean & Jerk	109 kg	Nora Jäggi	21 October 2017		Basel, Switzerland	
Total	195 kg	Nora Jäggi	30 March 2018	European Championships	Bucharest, Romania	
–75 kg
Snatch	91 kg	Nora Jäggi	23 September 2018	World University Championships	Biała Podlaska, Poland	
Clean & Jerk	114 kg	Nora Jäggi	15 September 2018		St. Gallen, Switzerland	
Total	204 kg	Nora Jäggi	15 September 2018		St. Gallen, Switzerland	
–90 kg
Snatch	79 kg	Vanessa Grosdanoff	3 February 2018		Basel, Switzerland	
Clean & Jerk	105 kg	Seirena Hochstrasser	9 June 2018		Tramelan, Switzerland	
Total	179 kg	Seirena Hochstrasser	9 June 2018		Tramelan, Switzerland	
+90 kg
Snatch	75 kg	Vanessa Grosdanoff	20 May 2017		Tramelan, Switzerland	
Clean & Jerk	100 kg	Standard				
Total	175 kg	Standard				
