= Bocicoiu Mare =

Bocicoiu Mare Великий Бичків
- Commune
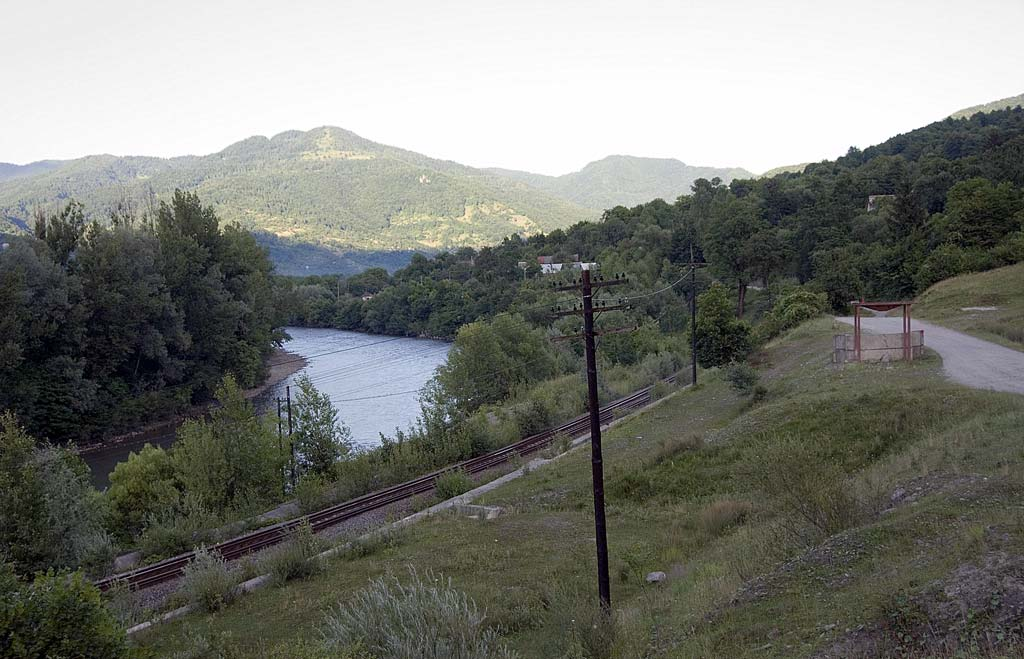
- Lunca la Tisa

- Location in Maramureș County

- Location in Romania
- Coordinates: 47°57′45″N 24°00′35″E
- Country: Romania
- County: Maramureș

Government
  - Mayor (2020–2024): Liviu Lazarciuc (PSD)
- Area: 24.02 km^{2} (9.27 sq mi)
- Elevation: 297 m (974 ft)
- Population (2021-12-01): 4,260
  - Density: 177/km^{2} (459/sq mi)
- Time zone: UTC+02:00 (EET)
  - Summer (DST): UTC+03:00 (EEST)
- Postal code: 437050
- Area code: +40 x59
- Vehicle reg.: MM
- Website: primariabocicoiumare.ro

Bocicoiu Mare (Hungarian: Nagybocskó or Újbocskó, Ukrainian: Великий Бичків, romanized: Velykyi Bychkiv, Yiddish: ביטשקוב, romanized: Bitshkif or Bicskof) is a commune in Maramureș County, Maramureș, Romania. It lies 9 kilometres east of Sighetu Marmației, across the Tisza River from Velykyy Bychkiv, Ukraine.

== Villages ==
The commune is composed of four villages: Bocicoiu Mare, Crăciunești, Lunca la Tisa, and Tisa.

In Romanian	In Hungarian	In Ukrainian	In Rusyn	In Yiddish
Bocicoiu Mare	Nagybocskó; Újbocskó	Великий Бичків		ביטשקוב (Bicskof)
Crăciunești	Karàcsonfalva; Tiszakarácsonyfalva	Кричунів	Крачуново	קרעטשניף (Kretchnif)
Lunca la Tisa	Tiszalonka	Луг над Тисою		
Tisa [Virișmort, until 1956]	Tiszaveresmart	Миків	Міково	ווירישמורט (Virishmort)

== History ==
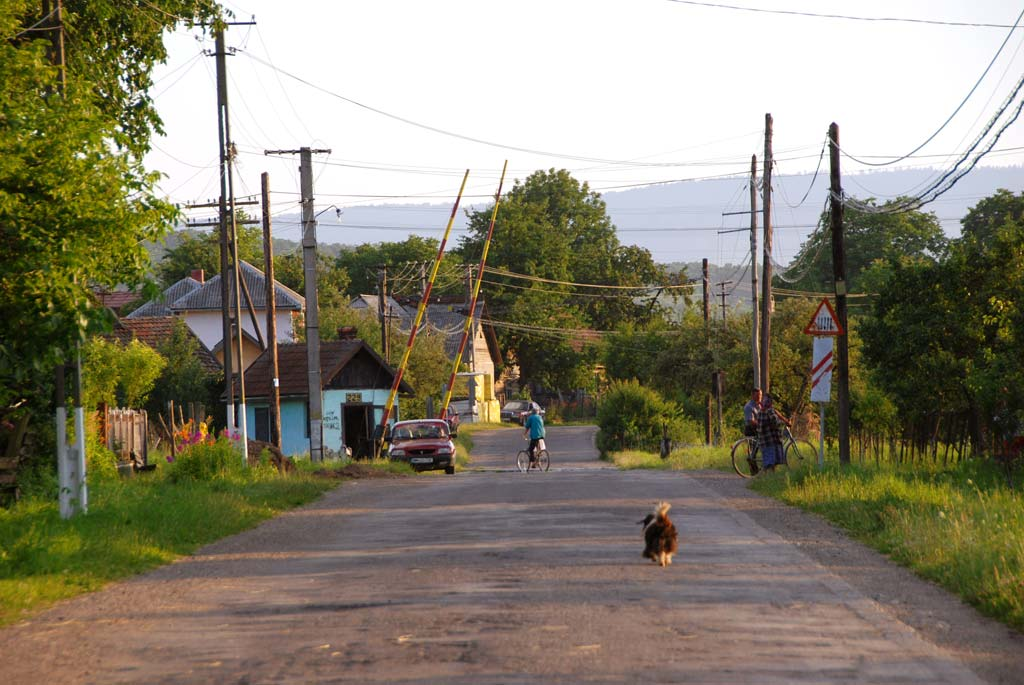
Main road in Bocicoiu Mare

The village was first mentioned in 1373, by the name Boshko. Its name derives from a Slavic word meaning "bull". From 1556 it belonged to the Báthory family. By 1711 a mansion already stood here. After the failed revolution led by Francis II Rákóczi, Germans settled down in the area.

The village was known as Németbocskó ("German Bocskó", later called Újbocskó or "New Bocskó") and was united with two villages (Nagybocskó and Kisbocskó; "Greater" and "Smaller" Bocskó) across the river, forming a greater village called Nagybocskó. This village had thus three parts: Újbocskó, which forms today's Bocicoiu Mare, and Kisbocskó and Nagybocskó, which form today's Velykyy Bychkiv.

Lunca la Tisa was part of the former Hungarian village of Lonka, which was cut into two parts after the World Wars, when the Tisza River became a natural border between Romania and Ukraine. Its Ukrainian half forms the village of Luh (Ukrainian: Луг, Hungarian: Lonka or Kis-Lonka, Yiddish: לעה-לונקה, romanized: Leh-Lunka)

== Demographics ==
Historical population
Year	Pop.	±%
1880	3,487	—
1900	4,805	+37.8%
1910	5,955	+23.9%
1930	4,662	−21.7%
1956	3,619	−22.4%
1977	4,385	+21.2%
1992	4,681	+6.8%
2002	4,468	−4.6%
2011	3,818	−14.5%
2021	4,260	+11.6%
Source: Census data

In 1910 the village had 5,955 inhabitants: 3,078 Ruthenians, 1,646 Hungarians, and 1,177 Germans. It belonged to the Hungarian county of Máramaros. After World War I, the village was split in two, and the river became a natural border of the two countries, with Velykyy Bychkiv in Czechoslovakia. In 1940, both halves became again part of Hungary, before the former split was reinstated at the end of World War II; however, due to new border arrangements, Velykyy Bychkiv became part of the Ukrainian SSR in 1945.

At the 2002 census, Bocicoiu Mare had a population of 4,468; of those, 76.8% were Romanian Orthodox, 8.5% Roman Catholic, 8.2% Greek-Catholic, and 4.7% stated they belonged to another religion. At the 2011 census, the commune had 3,818 inhabitants; of those, 53.2% were Ukrainians, 39.6% Romanians, and 6.8% Hungarians. At the 2021 census the population had increased to 4,260; of those, 49.46% were Romanians, 40.09% Ukrainians, and 4.41% Hungarians.

== Main sights ==
- Its Roman Catholic church was built in the 14th century in Gothic style architecture, but it was rebuilt several times and lost its Gothic elements.
