= Minor Characters =

1983 memoir by Joyce Johnson

Minor Characters: A Beat Memoir
- Author: Joyce Johnson
- Language: English
- Publisher: Houghton Mifflin
- Publication date: 1983
- ISBN: 0-395-32513-7 (first edition)
- LC Class: PS3560.O3795 Z47

Minor Characters: A Beat Memoir (1983) is a memoir by Joyce Johnson documenting her time with Jack Kerouac. The book also tells the story of the women of the Beat Generation, the "minor characters" of its title.

The book won a National Book Critics Circle Award.

== Critical reception ==
Kirkus Reviews wrote that "as a montage of 1950s Village life, with Mr. and Mrs. LeRoi Jones and Franz Kline and others passing through, this is almost always evocative, frequently quite touching."
