= Pace University Press =

University press

- Parent company: Pace University
- Country of origin: United States
- Headquarters location: New York City
- Publication types: Books
- Official website: press.pace.edu

Pace University Press is a university press affiliated with Pace University in New York City. The press—which was established in the late 1980s by Pace University professors Sherman Raskin and Mark Hussey—is most known for publishing works that analyze the writing of Virginia Woolf. Pace University Press also publishes journals that focus on beat poetry, comic books, psychology, and acting, among other topics.

== See also ==
- List of English-language book publishing companies
- List of university presses
