= Ronja (given name) =

- Pronunciation: RON-ya
- Gender: female

Origin
- Origin: Ronja, the Robber's Daughter
- Region of origin: Denmark, Iceland, Faeroes, Finland, Sweden, Norway

Other names
- Related names: Ronia

Ronja is a feminine given name in use largely in Scandinavian countries. It was made popular by the Swedish author Astrid Lindgren for her 1981 fantasy novel Ronja, the Robber's Daughter. In the English translation of the book the name was translated as Ronia. It may also be translated as Ronya.

It is also the Swedish rendering of the Russian diminutive Роня for Veronica.

Very few people were given this name in Scandinavian countries prior to 1981. In Finland, Ronja has been used as a first name as early as the 1920s.

It was the third most popular name given to baby girls born in the Faroe Islands in 2008 and is also rising in popularity in other Scandinavian countries.

== Notable bearers ==
- Ronja Aronsson (born 1997), Swedish footballer
- Ronja Eibl (born 1999), German cyclist
- Ronja Endres (born 1986), German politician
- Ronja Hilbig (born 1990), German singer
- Ronja Jenike (born 1989), German ice hockey player
- Rina Ronja Kari (born 1985), Danish politician
- Ronja Kemmer (born 1989), German politician
- Ronja Oja (born 1992), Finnish Paralympic athlete
- Ronja Mannov Olesen (born 1987), Danish actress
- Ronja Savolainen (born 1997), Finnish ice hockey player
- Ronja Schütte (born 1990), German rower
- Ronja Richardsdotter Stanley (born 1991), Finnish singer, known as Ronya
- Ronja Steinborn (born 1990), German modern pentathlete
- Ronja Alatalo (born 1999), Finnish actress
