= Ronya =

Finnish singer

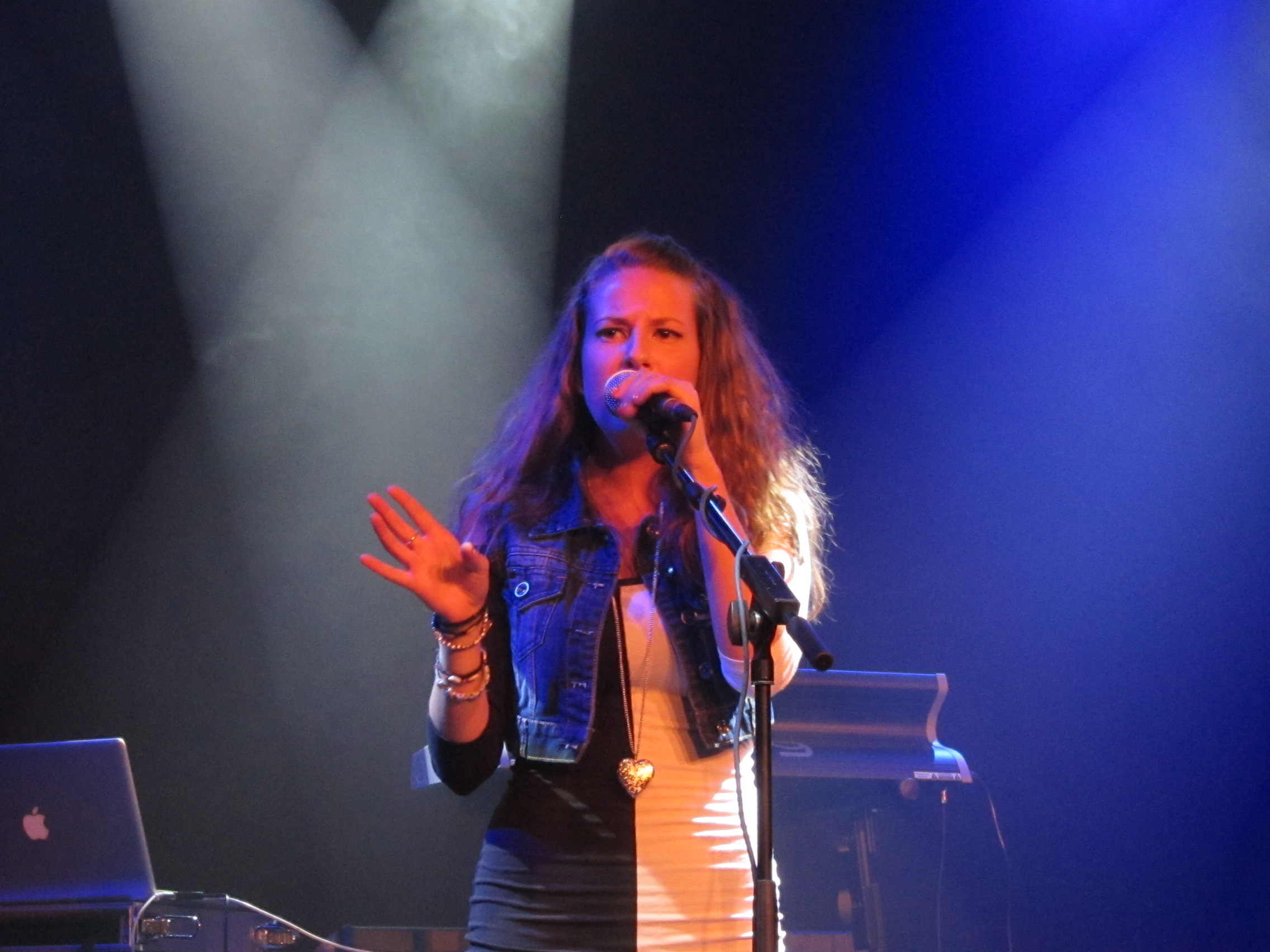
- Ronya in 2011

Background information
- Also known as: New Ro
- Born: Ronja Richardsdotter Gullichsen; 9 November 1991 (age 34); Siuntio, Finland
- Genres: Pop, electronic
- Occupation: Vocalist
- Years active: 2011–present
- Labels: Warner Music (2008–2013); Cocoa Music (2013–)

Ronja Richardsdotter Stanley (formerly Gullichsen; born 9 November 1991), known by their stage names Ronya and New Ro, is a Finnish-British singer-songwriter.

== Life and career ==
Ronya was born in Siuntio, Finland. They came to the fore in 2011 with their single "Annoying", which was played at YleX radio station. Ronya signed a contract with Warner Music Finland in 2008 when they were 16 years old. Their debut album The Key Is the Key was released on 13 June 2012.

Ronya released their second album Tides on 19 October 2015.

Ronya's father is British-born music producer Richard Stanley. They graduated from Tölö specialiseringsgymnasium in 2011. Ronya is a Swedish-speaking Finn.

Ronya is non-binary, and uses they/them pronouns. They have attention deficit hyperactivity disorder and autism.
