= Clemson University Press =

- Parent company: Clemson University
- Founded: 2000
- Country of origin: United States
- Headquarters location: Clemson, South Carolina
- Distribution: University of North Carolina Press
- Publication types: Books
- Official website: libraries.clemson.edu/press/

Clemson University Press is a university press associated with Clemson University, located in Clemson, South Carolina. The press was founded in 2000, and as of 2021, it issues around twenty-five publications a year, most of which focus on nineteenth- and twentieth-century literature. The press is currently a member of the Association of University Presses.

== History ==
The press was founded in 2000 as a "pedagogical center" that issued between three and five books annually. In 2014, Clemson University Press grew substantially by signing a "transatlantic publishing partnership" with Liverpool University Press: Under the terms of this deal, Clemson University Press will scout out and acquire books, while Liverpool University Press oversee the production, distribution, and marketing of the publications. In 2023, the press became a distribution client of the University of North Carolina Press's Longleaf Services.
