= Iacobeni, Suceava =

Iacobeni German: Jakobeny
- Commune
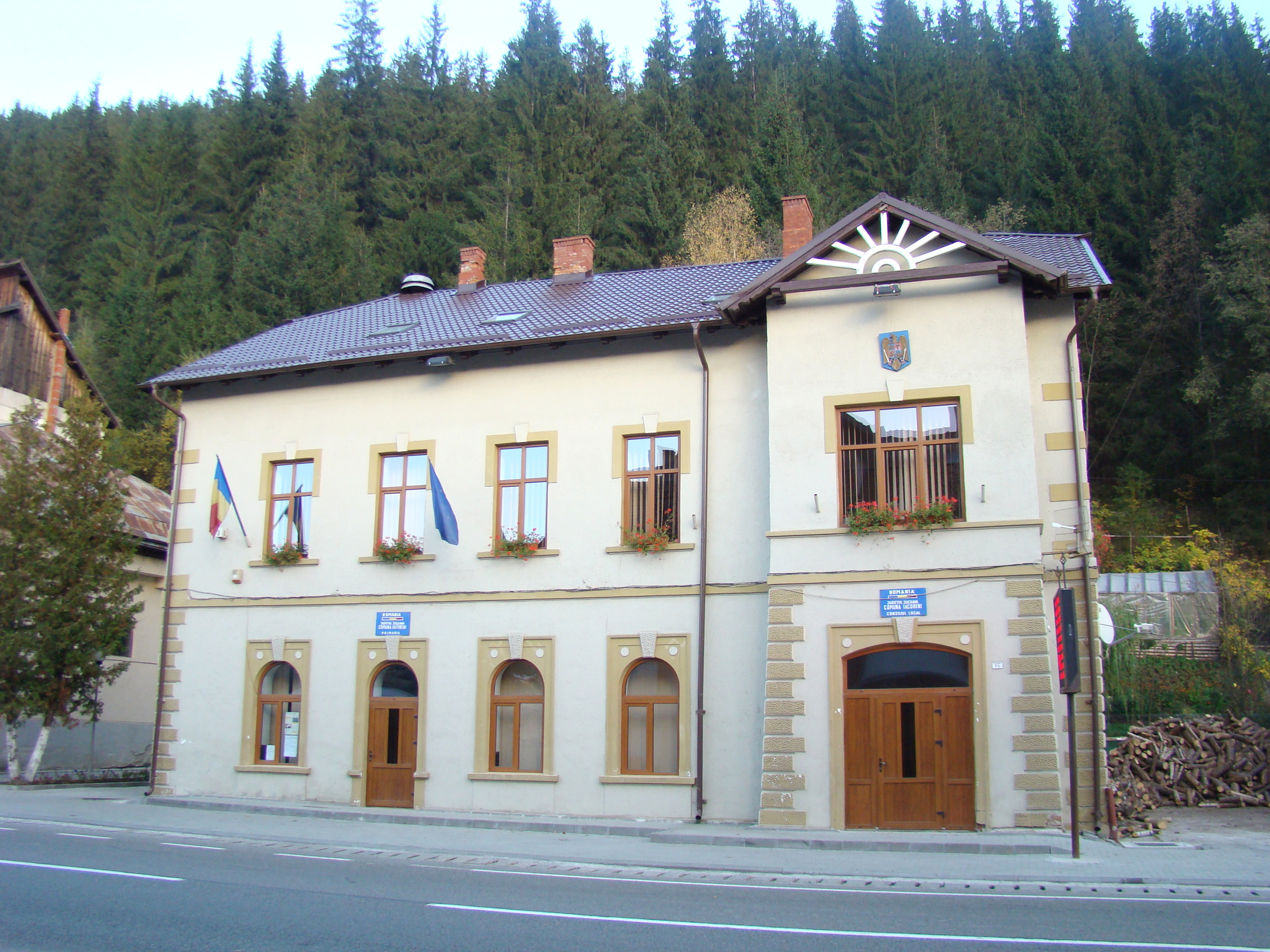
- The town hall in Iacobeni

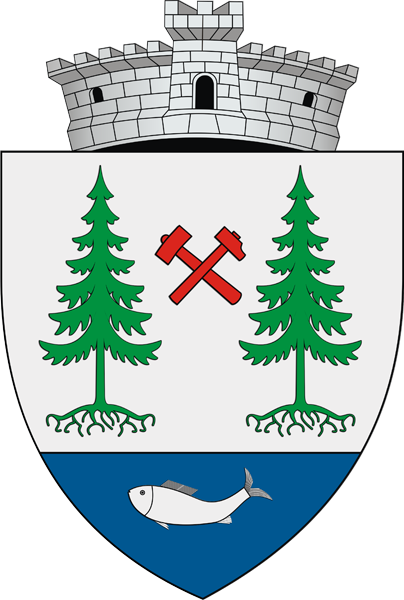
- Coat of arms

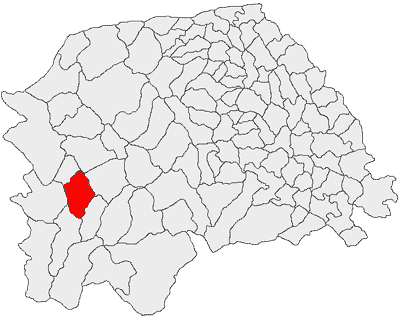
- Location in Suceava County

- Location in Romania
- Coordinates: 47°26′N 25°19′E
- Country: Romania
- County: Suceava

Government
  - Mayor (2020–2024): Viorel Maxim (PSD)
- Area: 62.36 km^{2} (24.08 sq mi)
- Elevation: 832 m (2,730 ft)
- Population (2021-12-01): 1,614
  - Density: 25.88/km^{2} (67.03/sq mi)
- Time zone: UTC+02:00 (EET)
  - Summer (DST): UTC+03:00 (EEST)
- Postal code: 727315
- Area code: (+40) 02 30
- Vehicle reg.: SV
- Website: www.comunaiacobeni.ro

Iacobeni (German: Jakobeny) is a commune located in Suceava County, in the historical region of Bukovina, northeastern Romania. It is composed of two villages: Iacobeni and Mestecăniș. It included Botoș and Ciocănești villages until 2002, when these were split off to form Ciocănești commune.

The commune is located in the western part of Suceava County, some 100 km (62 mi) from the county seat, Suceava. It lies at an altitude of 832 m (2,730 ft), on the banks of the Bistrița River.

== History ==
Until the mid-20th century the commune was also home to a sizeable Zipser German community (part of the larger Bukovina German population of the county and the entire historical region) which initially settled here during the late 18th century, during the modern period, or in the time of the Habsburg monarchy, and later on, Austria-Hungary.

== Administration and local politics ==
=== Commune council ===
The commune's current local council has the following political composition, according to the results of the 2020 Romanian local elections:

Party	Seats	Current Council
Social Democratic Party (PSD)	6	
National Liberal Party (PNL)	5	

== Gallery ==
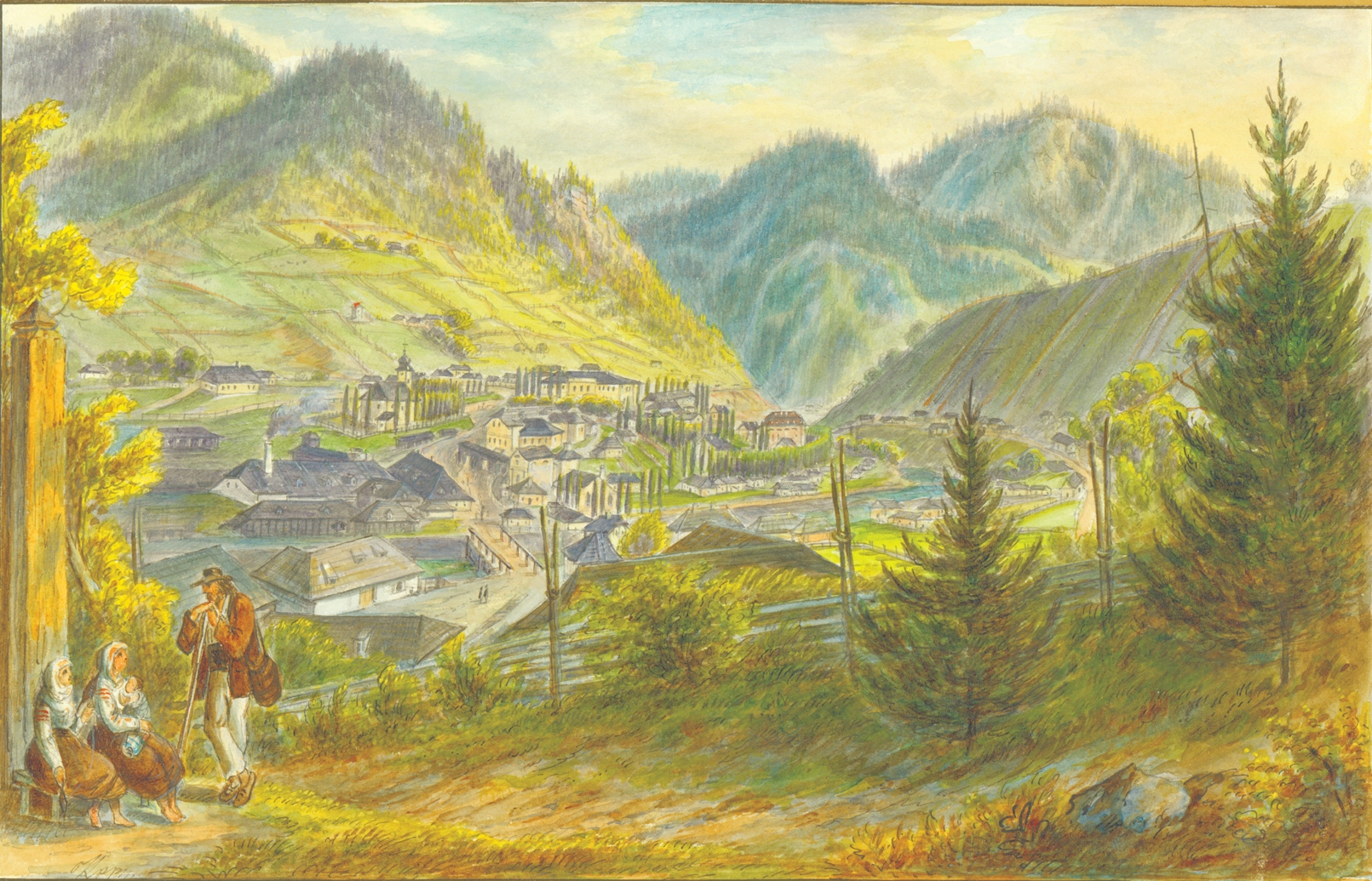
Iacobeni by Franz Xaver Knapp (1867)

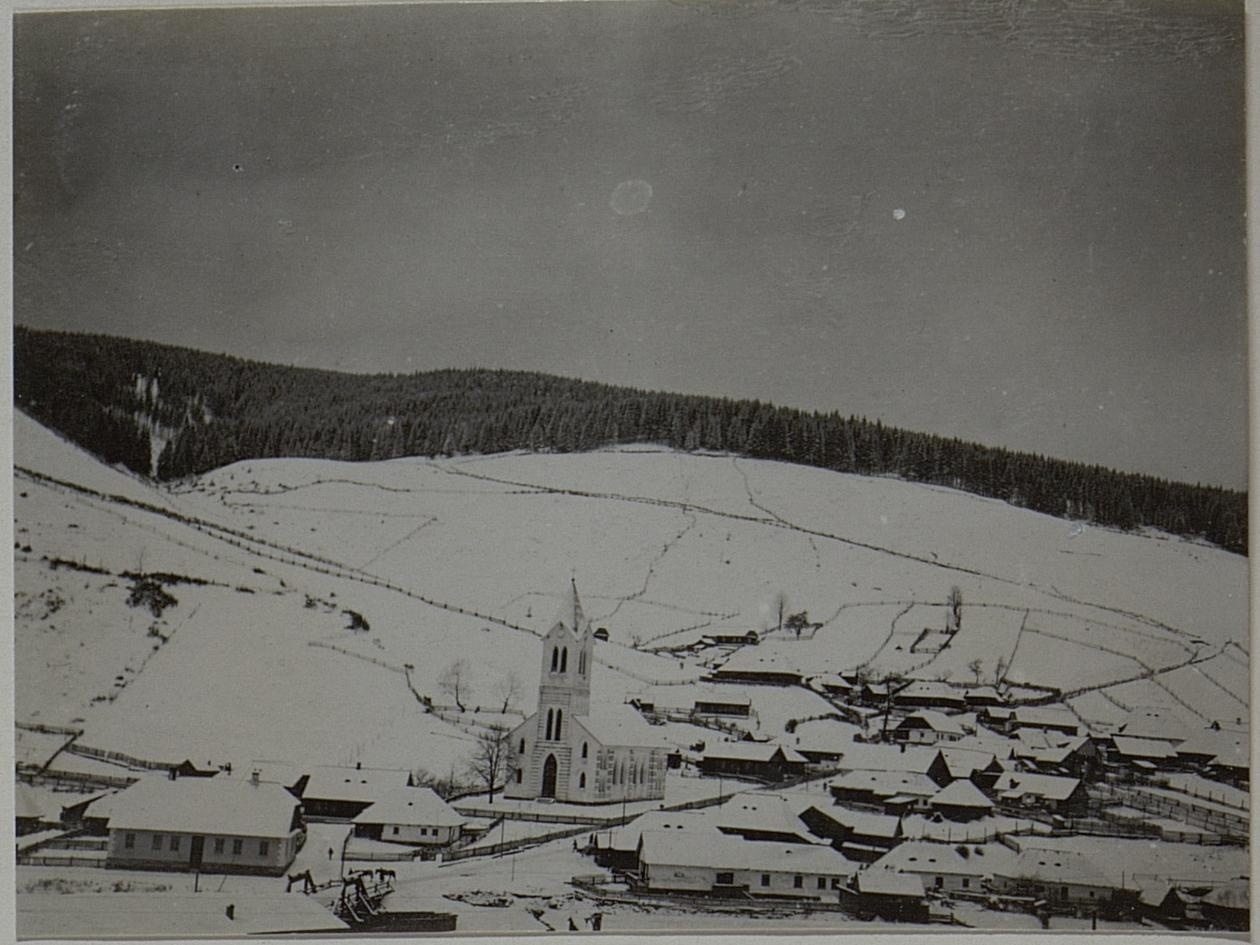
Iacobeni in winter time in 1916

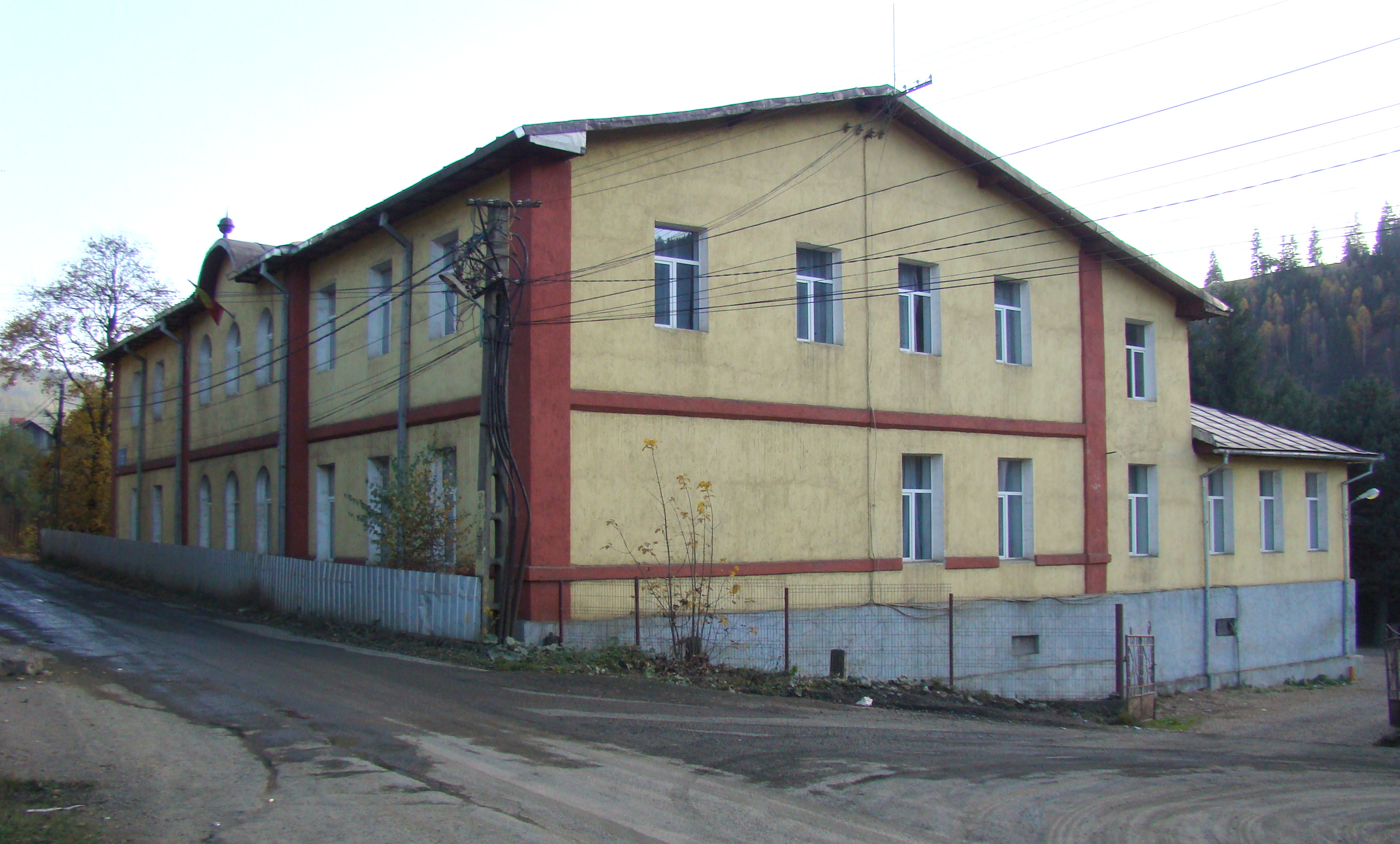
Liviu Suhar Technological High School (former mining high school)

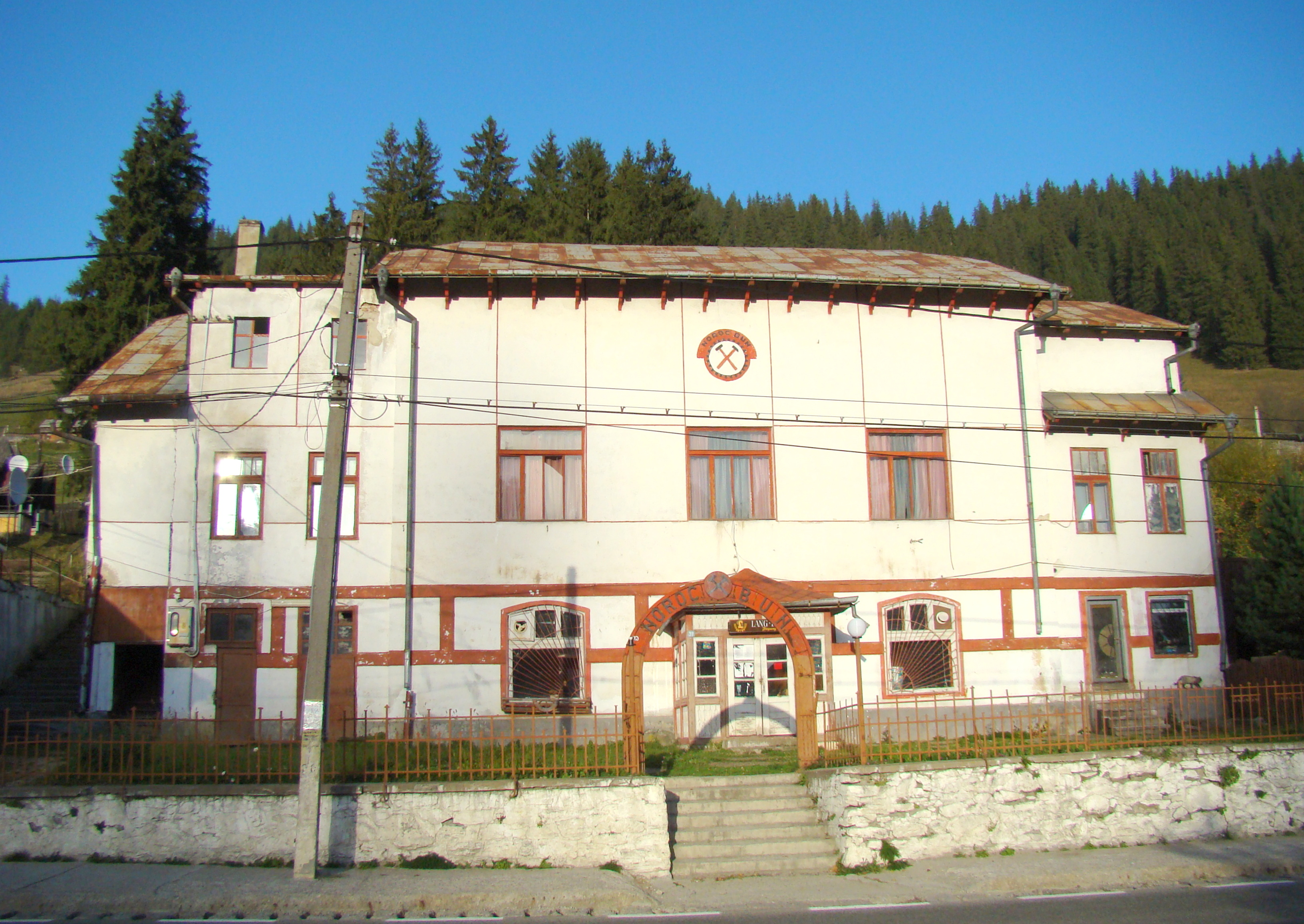
Iacobeni mining branch

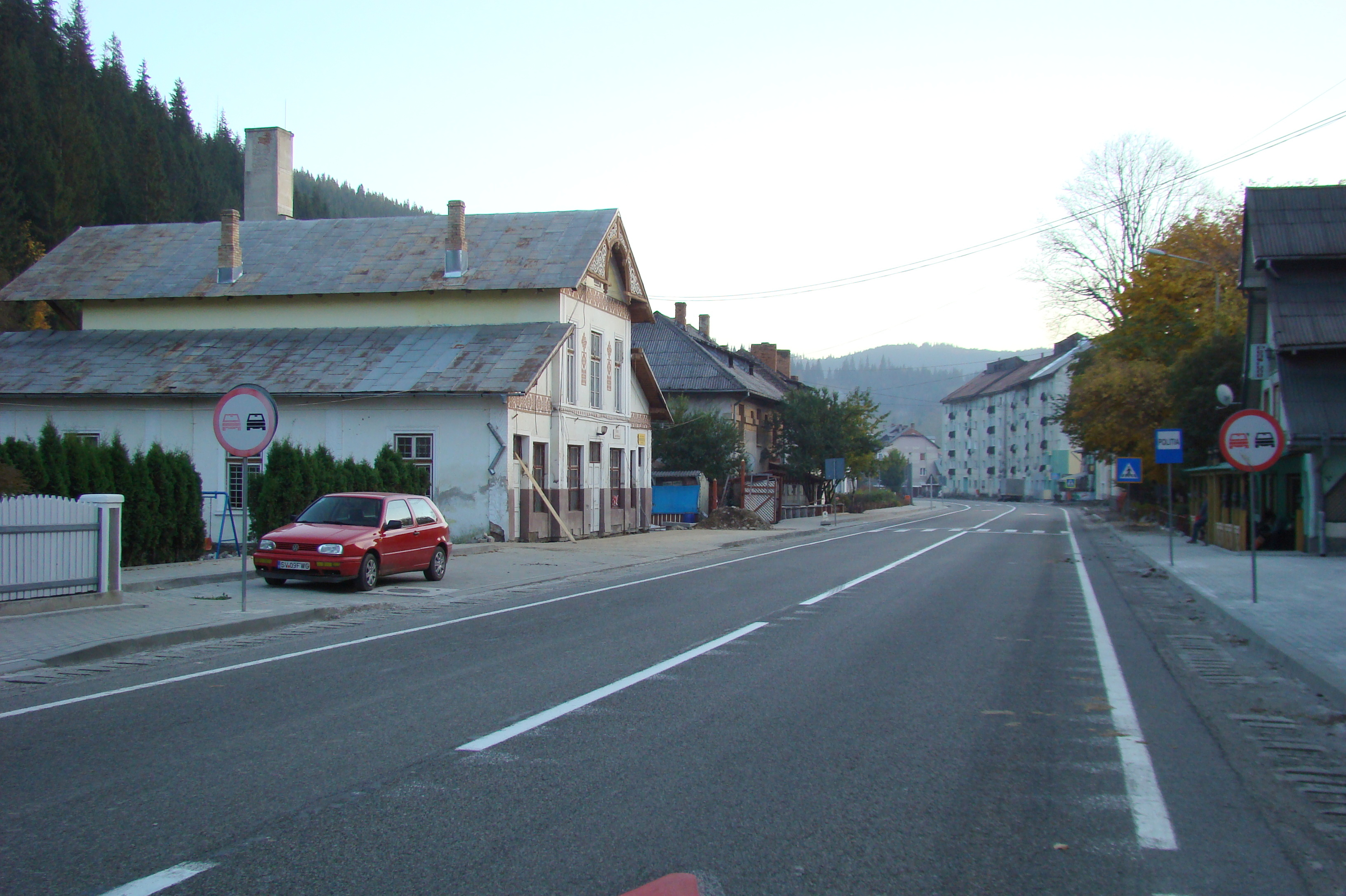
DN17 going through Iacobeni

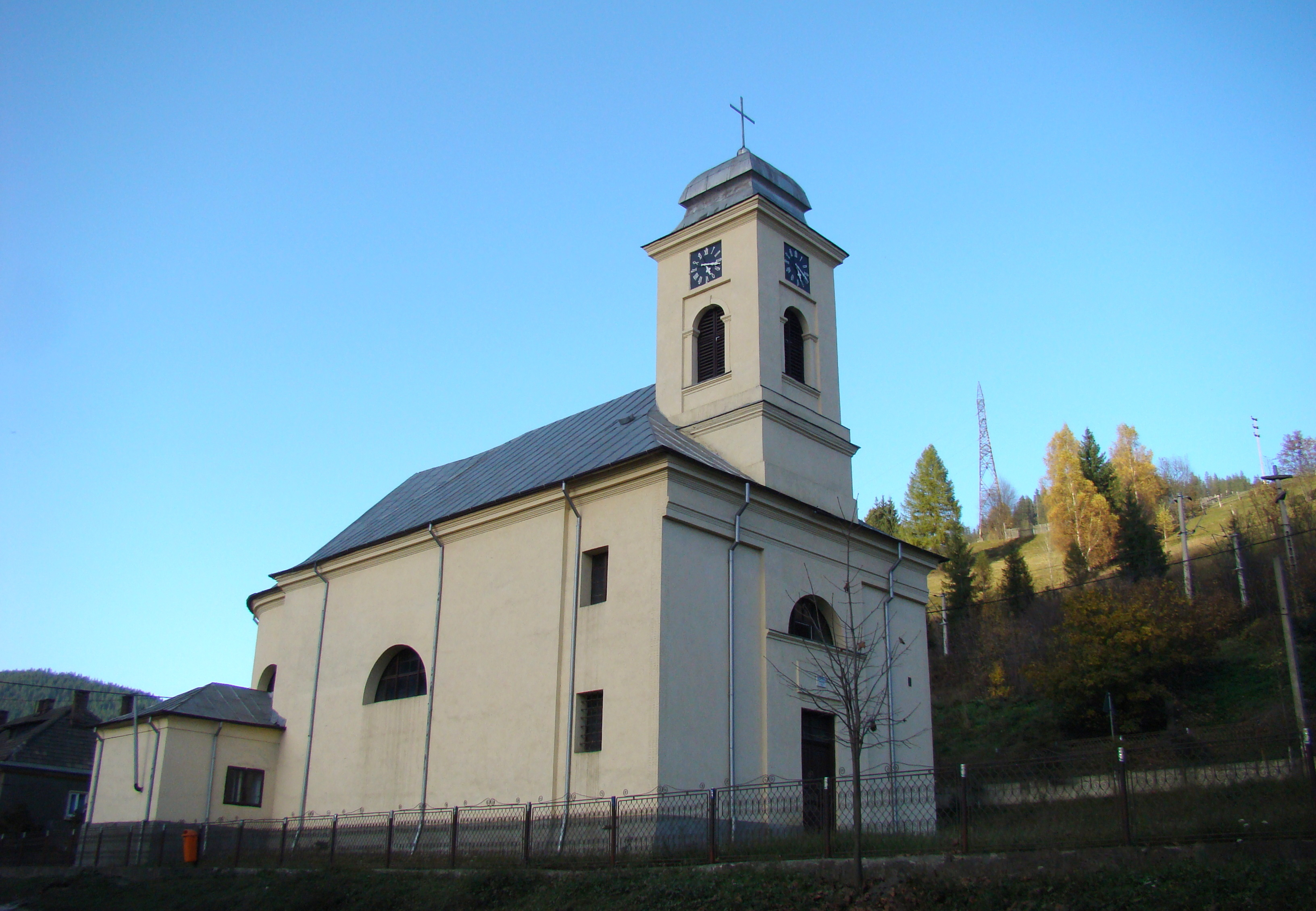
Roman Catholic church

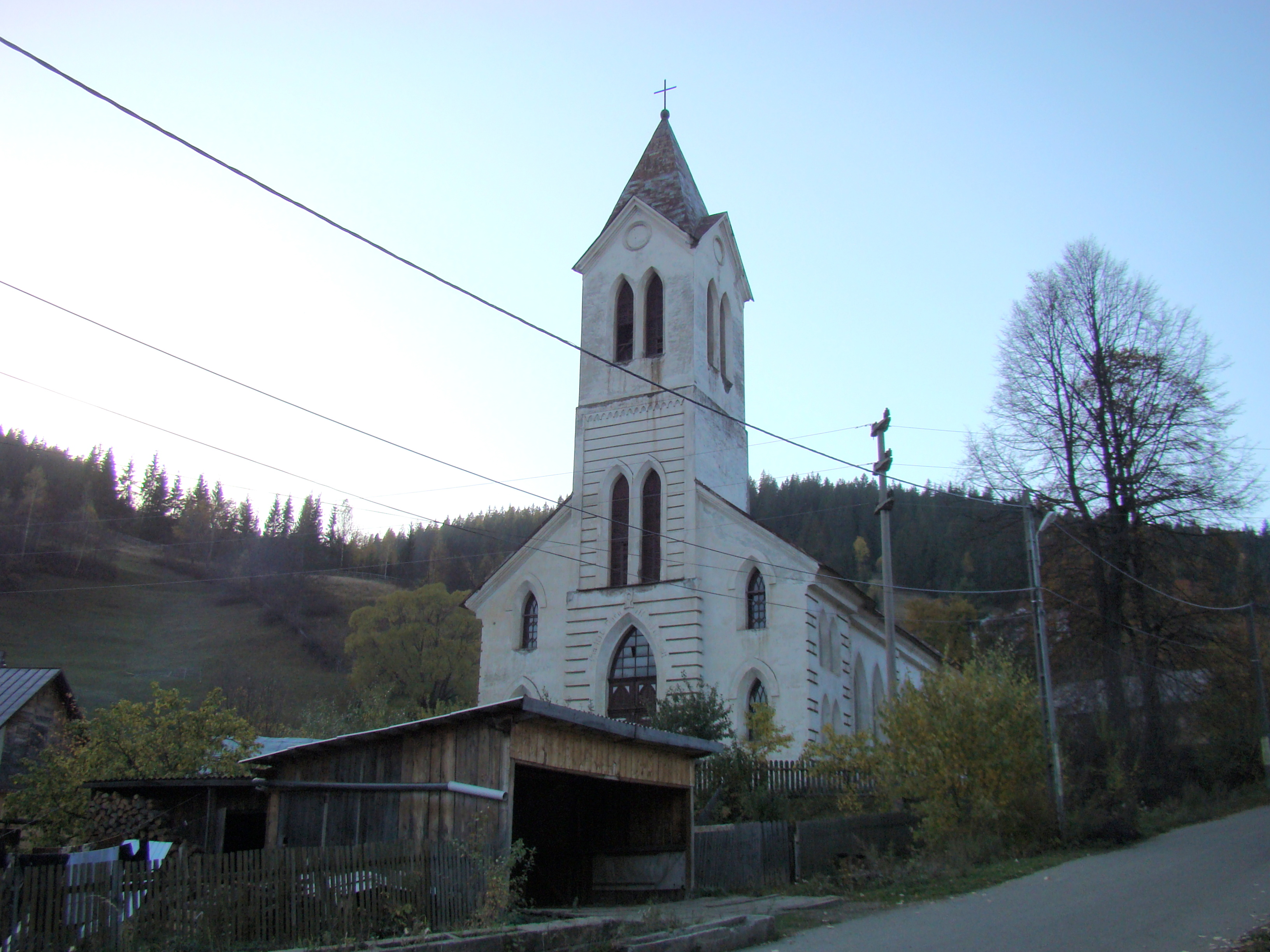
Evangelical Lutheran church

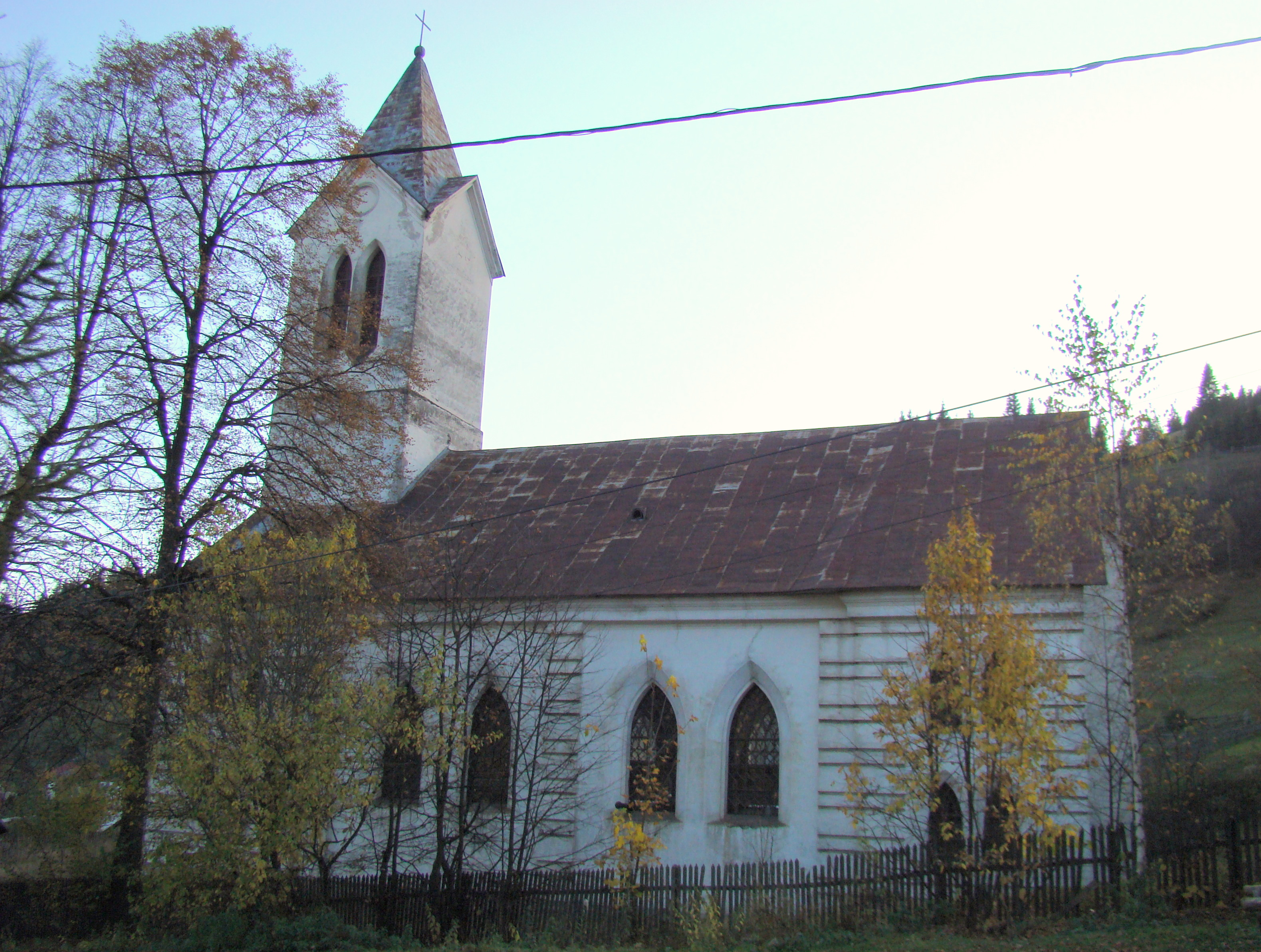
Evangelical Lutheran church (side view)

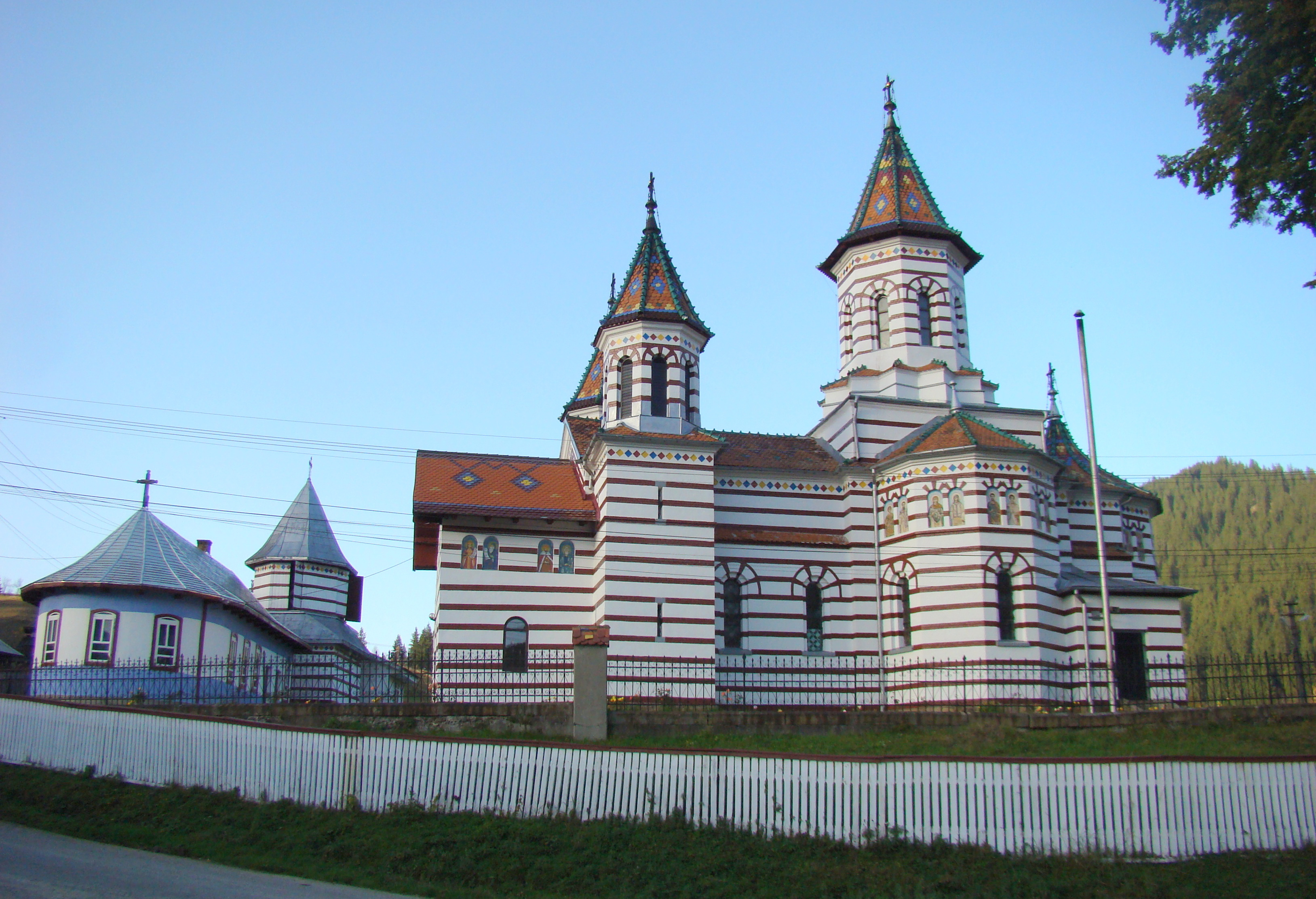
Saint George Orthodox church

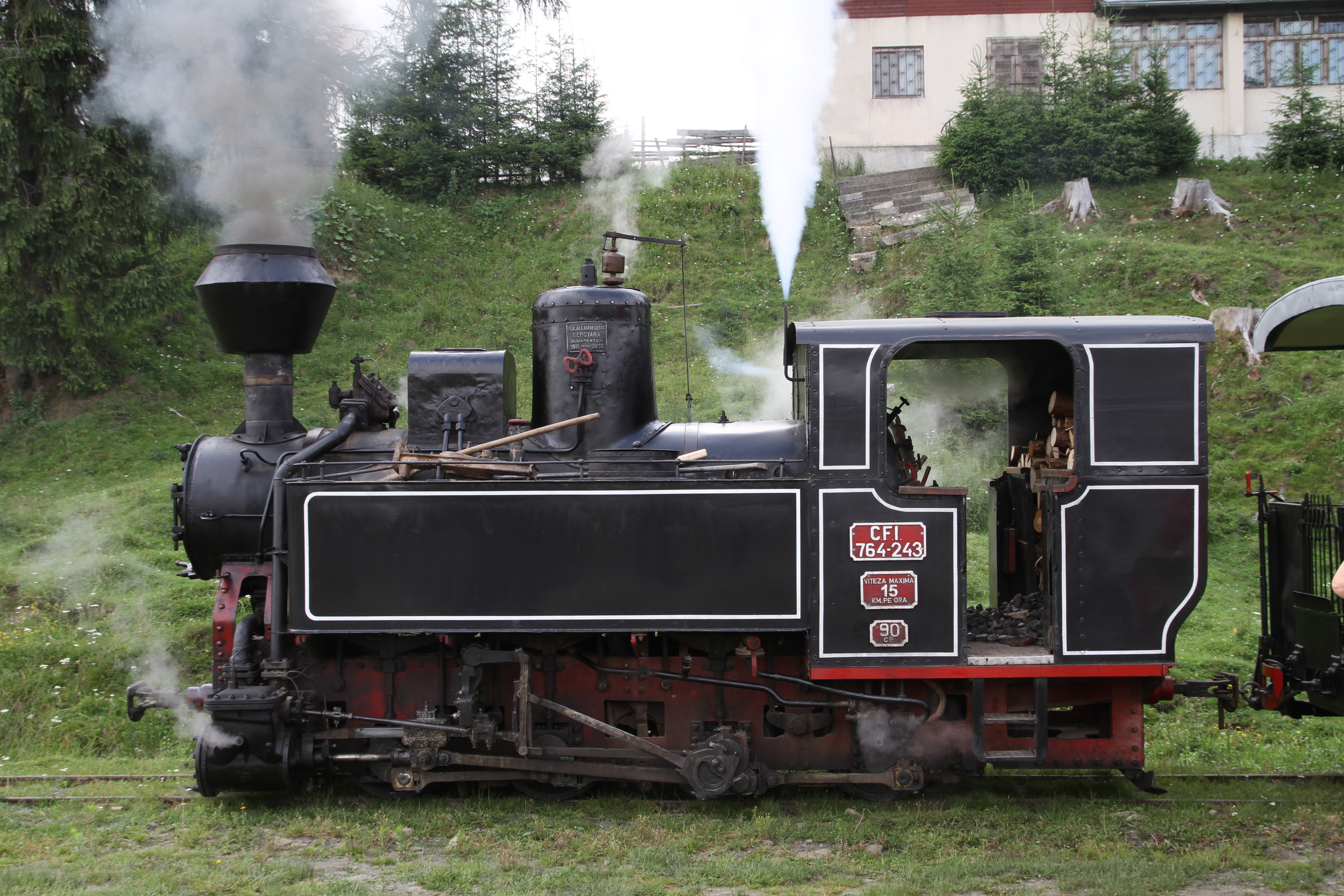
Mocănița narrow-gauge steam train (model CFI 764-243) at the former forest railway station at Comandău

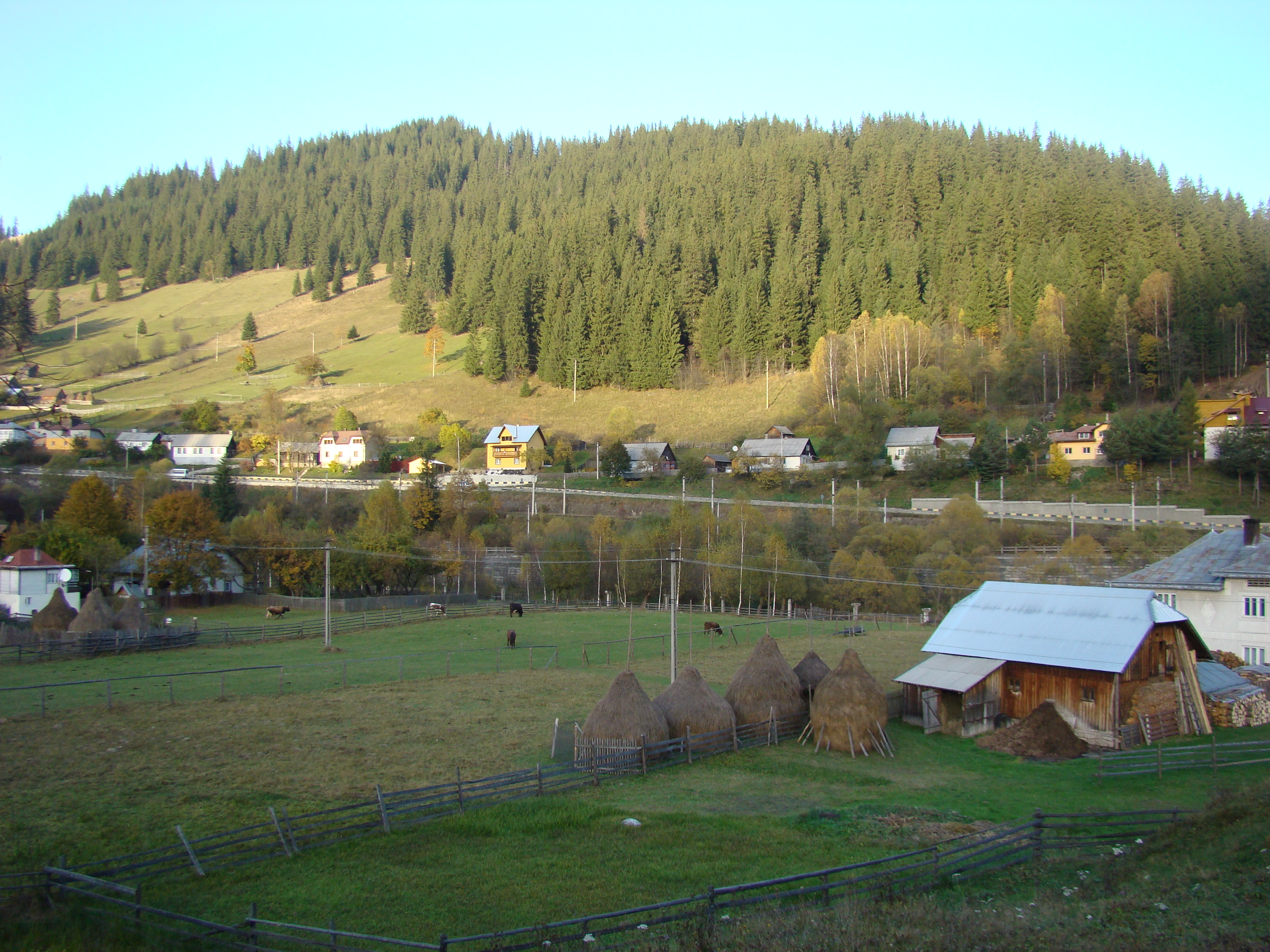
Rural landscape in Iacobeni

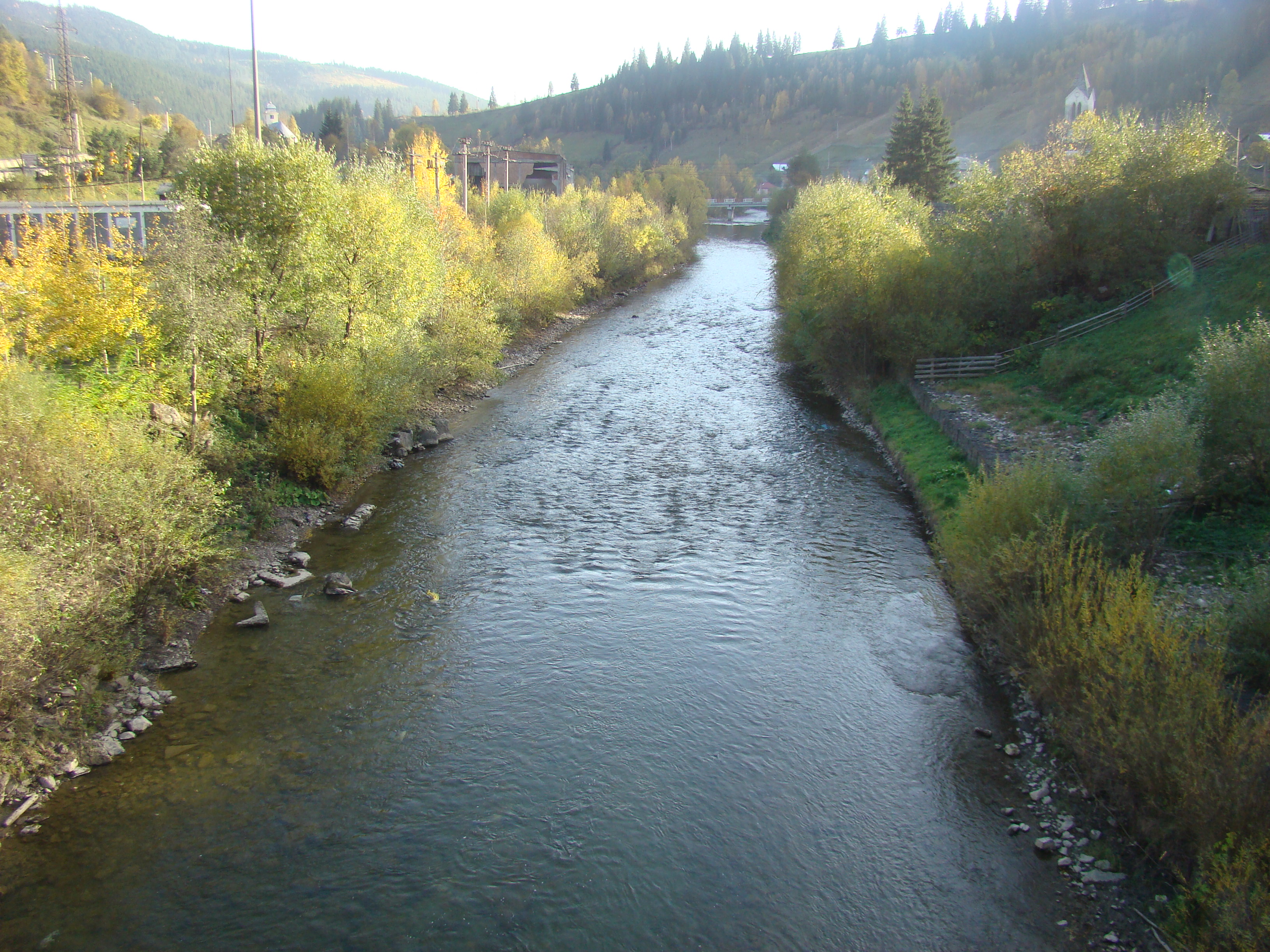
The Golden Bistrița River flowing through Iacobeni
