= Florian Porcius =

Austro-Hungarian ethnic Romanian botanist (1816–1906)

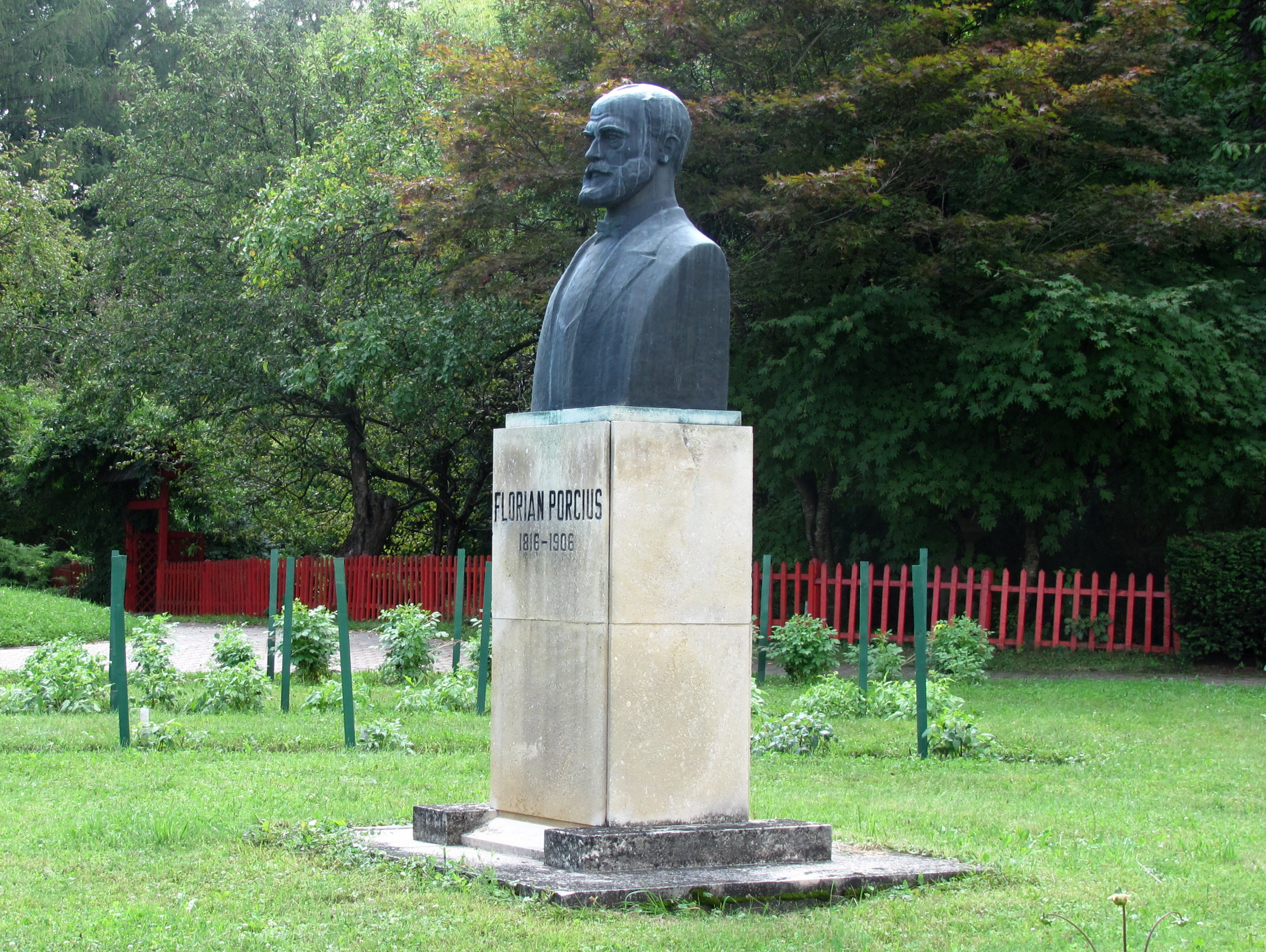
Bust of Porcius in the Cluj-Napoca Botanical Garden

Florian Porcius (August 28 [O.S. August 16] 1816–May 30 [O.S. May 17] 1906) was an Austro-Hungarian ethnic Romanian botanist and administrator.

Born in Rodna, a village in Transylvania's Bistrița-Năsăud County, he came from a poor peasant family, and his parents were Precup Șteopan and his wife Ioana. He was raised by his grandfather, the priest Gherasim Porcu (Latinized as Porcius), whose name he took by adoption. In 1824, he entered the primary school in Rodna, for miners' sons, where he began to pick up the German and Hungarian languages. From 1827 to 1831, he attended the German-language military normal school in Năsăud, followed by the high schools in Blaj and Cluj from 1833 to 1836.

In 1836, Porcius was named a schoolteacher in his native village. In 1844, Porcius he a scholarship from the Military Frontier fund allowing him to study at the Vienna pedagogical institute for two years; while there, he audited courses on botany. After returning home, he began teaching in Zagra in 1847 and in Năsăud the following year. After the Transylvanian Revolution of 1848, he occupied various administrative posts, up to that of deputy prefect (vice-captain) of the Năsăud district, until retiring in 1877. A defender of Transylvanian Romanians' rights, he obtained an audience with Emperor Ferdinand I in 1848, causing him to be arrested and deported to Cluj for a year.

Although Porcius was involved in botany as a passionate amateur, his work was acknowledged by the scientific authorities of the empire. For over sixty years, he explored the Rodna Mountains, methodically studying their flora and discovering several endemic species, of which two bear his name. These are Centaurea carpatica, Lychnis nivalis, Heracleum carpaticum, Pulmonaria dacica, Festuca porcii and Saussurea porcii. He maintained close contact with leading botanists of Central Europe as well as from the Romanian Old Kingdom. He collaborated with Dimitrie Brândză on Flora Dobrogei, and was tasked with specifying the nomenclature and synonyms, as well as compiling cross-references.

Porcius was among the most prominent originators of Romanian botanical terminology. A manuscript of his, kept in the Romanian Academy Library and titled Explicarea termenilor botanici, care se folosesc în opurile botanice la descrierea plantelor fanerogame și criptogame vasculare. Cu îndrumările și anexele necesare pentru determinarea genurilor și familiilor naturale care provin din Europa medie, played a crucial role in this process. His most important publication, from 1868, is Enumeratio plantarum phanerogamicarum districtus quondam Naszondensis; as was customary at the time, it is written in Latin. A Romanian variant appeared in 1881 as Diagnozele plantelor fanerogame și cryptogame vasculare, care provin spontaneu din Transilvania. This was followed in 1893 by Diagnoza plantelor fanerogame și cryptogame vasculare care cresc spontaneu în Transilvania și nu sunt descrise în opul lui Koch: Synopsis Florae Germanicae et Helveticae. He was elected a titular member of the Romanian Academy in 1882; this was due to his scientific merits as well as his status as the most important Romanian botanist in Transylvania during the Austro-Hungarian period. He died in Rodna.

The standard author abbreviation Porcius is used to indicate this person as the author when citing a botanical name.
