= Valea Vinului mine =

Mine in Romania

- Location: Rodna, Bistrița-Năsăud County, Romania
- Products: Lead, Zinc, Copper, Sulfur
- Financial year: 2008
- Opened: 1980

The Valea Vinului mine is a large mine in the northwest of Romania in Rodna, Bistrița-Năsăud County. Valea Vinului represents one of the largest lead and zinc reserve in Romania having estimated reserves of 5.25 million tonnes of ore grading 0.79% lead and 2.48% zinc thus resulting in 0.04 million tonnes of lead and 0.13 million tonnes of zinc.
