= Inău =

Inău may refer to the following places in Romania:

- Inău, a village in the town of Târgu Lăpuș, Maramureș County
- Inău, a village in Someș-Odorhei Commune, Sălaj County
- Inău, a tributary of the Someș in Sălaj County
- Ineu Peak, a mountain peak in the Rodna Mountains

== Other uses ==
- Ika-6 na Utos, a 2016 Philippine television drama series broadcast by GMA Network
