= Valea Blaznei mine =

Mine in Rodna, Romania

- Location: Rodna, Bistrița-Năsăud County, Romania
- Products: Lead, Zinc, Copper, Sulfur
- Production: 195 tonnes of lead, 236 tonnes of copper, 5,888 tonnes of sulfur and 635 tonnes of zinc
- Financial year: 2008
- Opened: 1774

The Valea Blaznei mine is a large mine in the north of Romania in Rodna, Bistrița-Năsăud County, 50 km southwest of Bistrița and 699 km north-west of the capital, Bucharest. Valea Blaznei represents one of the largest lead and zinc reserve in Romania having estimated reserves of 10.5 million tonnes of ore grading 0.76% lead and 2.48% zinc thus resulting in 0.08 million tonnes of lead and 0.26 million tonnes of zinc.
