= Sârbi Susani church =

Heritage site in Maramureș County, Romania

Coordinates: 47°45′02″N 23°56′11″E

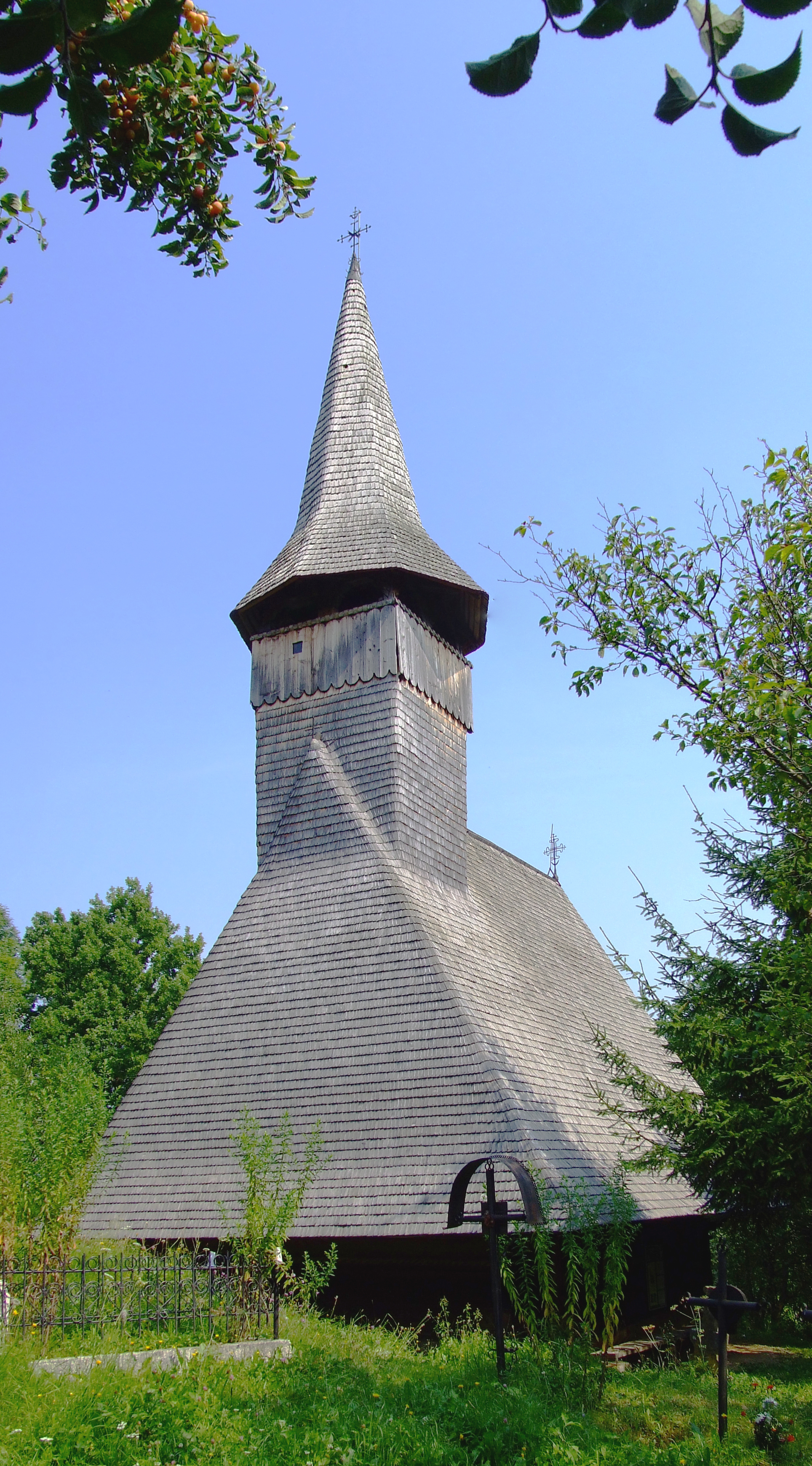
The Sârbi Susani church

The Sârbi Susani church stands in the village of Sârbi, Budești commune, in the Cosău valley of Maramureș County, in the historical region of Maramureș, now in Romania. This church is a surviving representative of the oldest wooden churches of Maramureș: those with only one level of eaves.

== Construction ==
The wooden church from Sârbi Susani, was dendrochronologically dated from the winter of 1638–1639, i.e., from the moment the timbers were felled; thus the construction might have taken place during 1639 or very soon after that. This church appears to have been built by the same master carpenter as those from Slătioara (before 1639) and Budești Josani (1643).

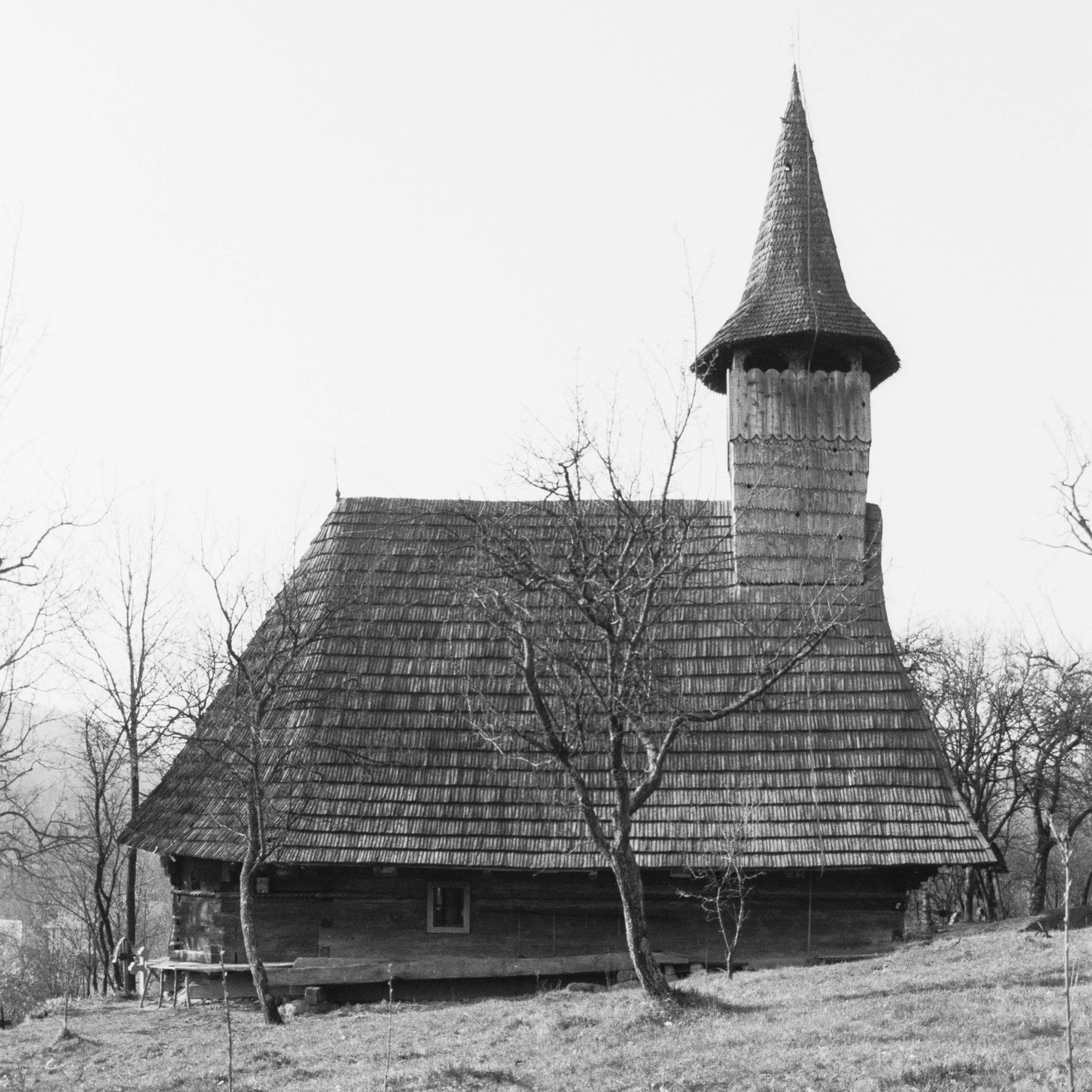
Sârbi Susani, the northern side

This church is quite modest in size, yet still really charming. Around its sanctuary the master carpenter played with the consoles under the eaves purlins like nowhere else. His devotion for this sacred building can be further read in the warm way he softened the plain timber walls with the rope moulding all around, with the small cuts in the frame of the southern window and even of the precinct gate, which, although fragmentary, is probably the oldest one surviving in Maramureș. The noble founders of this modest house of worship might have been either poor or conservative, if they couldn't afford or did not wanted bells for a tower, iron for the hinges of the doors, carved stones for the altar table or glasses for the windows. Whatever the situation was, the carpenter had to solve the shortage of resources in a very traditional way, replacing the missing materials with pieces of wood. These could have been the reasons why the church from Sârbi Susani retains the most ancient features in the local architecture.

== The enigmatic message on the portal ==
The best-preserved portal in Maramureș, which entirely displays the high professional grade of a church carpenter, is in Sârbi Susani. Among the various designs recorded on the portals around Maramureș this is without a doubt the most intricate and rich in detail known. Due to its rich symbolism, it needs three levels of reading: descriptive, mythological, and Christian.

The distinctive features that immediately attract attention are the moulding rope inclosing an elaborate composition of triple crosses and rosettes of various patterns and sizes. The triple crosses occupy the middle field of the three pieces of the portal, whereas the largest rosettes appear on both sides of each cross. The upper corners are covered by large sun rosettes while at the sill the straight mouldings turn round inwards closing the work. The entire composition has a symmetrical scheme, yet with many different details. Finally, a multitude of small triangles breaks up the background in shifting spots of light and shadow.

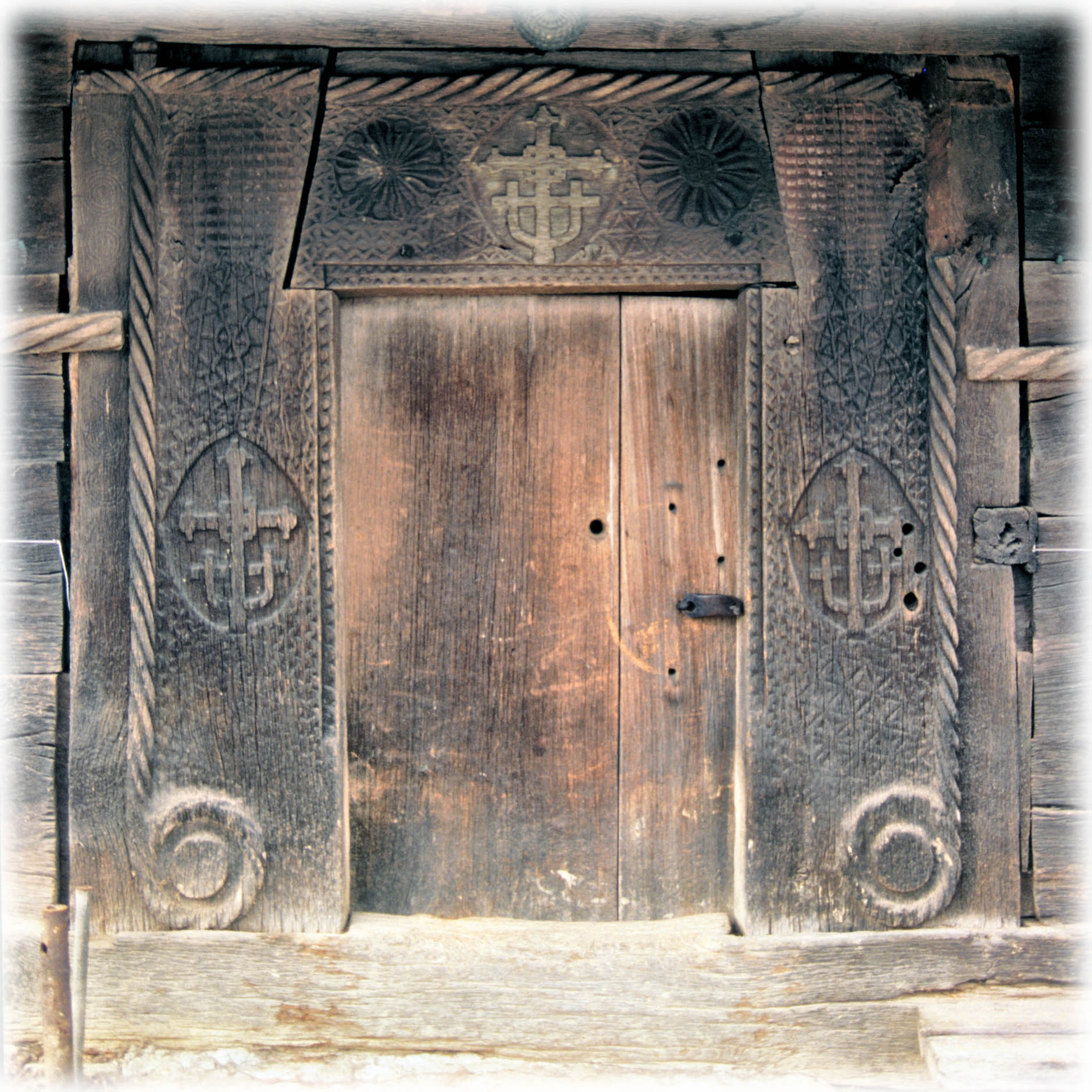
Sârbi Susani, the portal at the entrance

We need to further focus on this exceptional portal and its potential mythological message. It has been long emphasised the importance of the solar symbols in the local vernacular art. Yet, this portal displays only two rosettes that can be related to the sun and possibly the cross as a symbol of Jesus Christ, which actually is also connected to the sun. The other symbols are rather linked to the other celestial body, i.e., the Moon. The relief moulding rope seems to indicate the presence of the snake, which, like other monsters in ancient legends, protects the sacred room. The snake is a dominant motif on the church portals throughout the Carpathian Mountains, most often in stylized form, but in a few cases even in plain shapes. According to Mircea Eliade, the snake was considered a lunar beast in the old European beliefs, and therefore it is possible to read the lower part of the portal, on each side, as a full or new moon coiled up by a snake. In the same context, we should move our attention upon the indented pattern around the aperture, which in the imagery of the local needle women represents the water wave or the river water, possibly the life-giving water of a spring, surprisingly identical with the old Egyptian hieroglyph for running water. Consequently, the small triangles filling the space in between the rosettes and crosses may represent small drops of rain fertilising the fields.

There is a still higher level to decode the composition on the portal of the entrance. From a Christian perspective, this complex composition with heavenly bodies closely illustrates a Byzantine liturgical calendar. As in the West, the Byzantine liturgical year consists of two overlaying cycles with their respective series of feasts. First it is the Easter cycle (ciclu pascal) of the moveable feasts and second the monthly cycle (ciclu sanctoral) of the fixed feasts. In the Byzantine rite, the offices of the monthly cycle for fixed feasts are gathered in twelve books, one for every month, all together named Menaion. The Easter cycle is centred on the variable date of the commemoration of the Christ's Passion and is divided in three periods: the pre-paschal (10 weeks before Resurrection day), the paschal (8 weeks, from the Resurrection day to Whitsunday), and the post-paschal (variable number of weeks in between the other two periods). The service books containing the specific offices for the three periods are named Triodion, Pentecostarion and respectively Octoechos. The three periods are therefore better known by the names of their respective offices. On the portal from Sârbi Susani we can first distinguish the moulding rope carved in relief protecting the entrance and the composition. Starting from the coiled moon at the left and going round to the other coiled moon at right, the moulding rope represents the ecclesiastic year as a whole, from the month of September to August, according to the Byzantine practice.

The brake in three parts of the moulding suggests the division in three periods of the Easter cycle. Accordingly, the three pieces of the portal should represent, from left to right, in a sunwise move, the Octoechos, Triodion and Pentecostarion periods. Indeed, the Octoechos period is particularly individualized on the left jamb by the 8 lateral small rosettes representing the characteristic 8 modes in which the hymns of the offices are sung. Moreover, the additional 9th rosette at the very bottom might allude to the distinctive 9 odes of the canon in the Octoechos. The right jamb is in its turn identified with the Pentecostarion period by another 5 lateral rosettes hinting at the Pentecost or the period of 50 days after the Passover. The lintel in between naturally represents the Triodion period and needed no distinctive signs. Once the three parts of the portal are identified with the three periods of the Easter cycle, the expected significance of the triple crosses in the middle fields should be the main feasts commemorating the life and the activity of the Christ. Thus, the triple cross at the left corresponds to Christ's Nativity and baptism, the one in the middle above the entrance commemorates Christ's Passion and the third one at the right is a symbol of Christ's Resurrection and Ascension and nevertheless of the descent of the Holy Ghost or the Whitsunday. As a result, the entire Easter cycle appears well illustrated. In order to be complete, this calendar only needs the presence of the monthly cycle. Indeed, the twelve rosettes flanking the triple crosses, 6 small and 6 large, represent the 12 moons or months of the year.

In the upper corners, the large discs seem to mark the sun at the winter (left) and summer (right) solstices. The presence of all the major feasts and offices along the entire Byzantine ecclesiastic year gives the impression to call the worshipers to plainly participate in them. It is possible that the water wave around the aperture might represent the Jordan River and eventually even the Holy Spirit in which Jesus was baptised. Moreover, the small triangles entirely filling the space in between the large figures seem to further urge the Christians to uninterrupted prays. This is a strong invitation to improve through faith in Christ and participation in the life of the Church, in a true Byzantine monastic tradition.

The third level gives the most comprehensible reading of the portal's composition. Its Christian symbolism strongly revolves around the Passion of Jesus and the salvation of humankind deriving from it. The mythological reading does not impede the Christian message since both seek heavenly regenerating gifts. We stand here in front of a rich and refined language of vernacular and Christian symbols, aimed to lift our souls, hearts and minds beyond the limits of our earthly existence. Actually, this is one of the main fascinations with numerous portals from the wooden churches all around the Carpathian Mountains. The central motif, of the middle cross representing Christ's Passion and the side rosettes representing the two solstices, concentrates the Christian message being often carved on church and house portals. This reading appears now obvious thanks to the elaborate composition from Sârbi Susani. There is an imperative need to document the hundreds of surviving portals left by the church carpenters in the Carpathians, go beyond their decorative beauty and recover their enigmatic language. That would be a great achievement for the European cultural heritage.

== Gallery ==
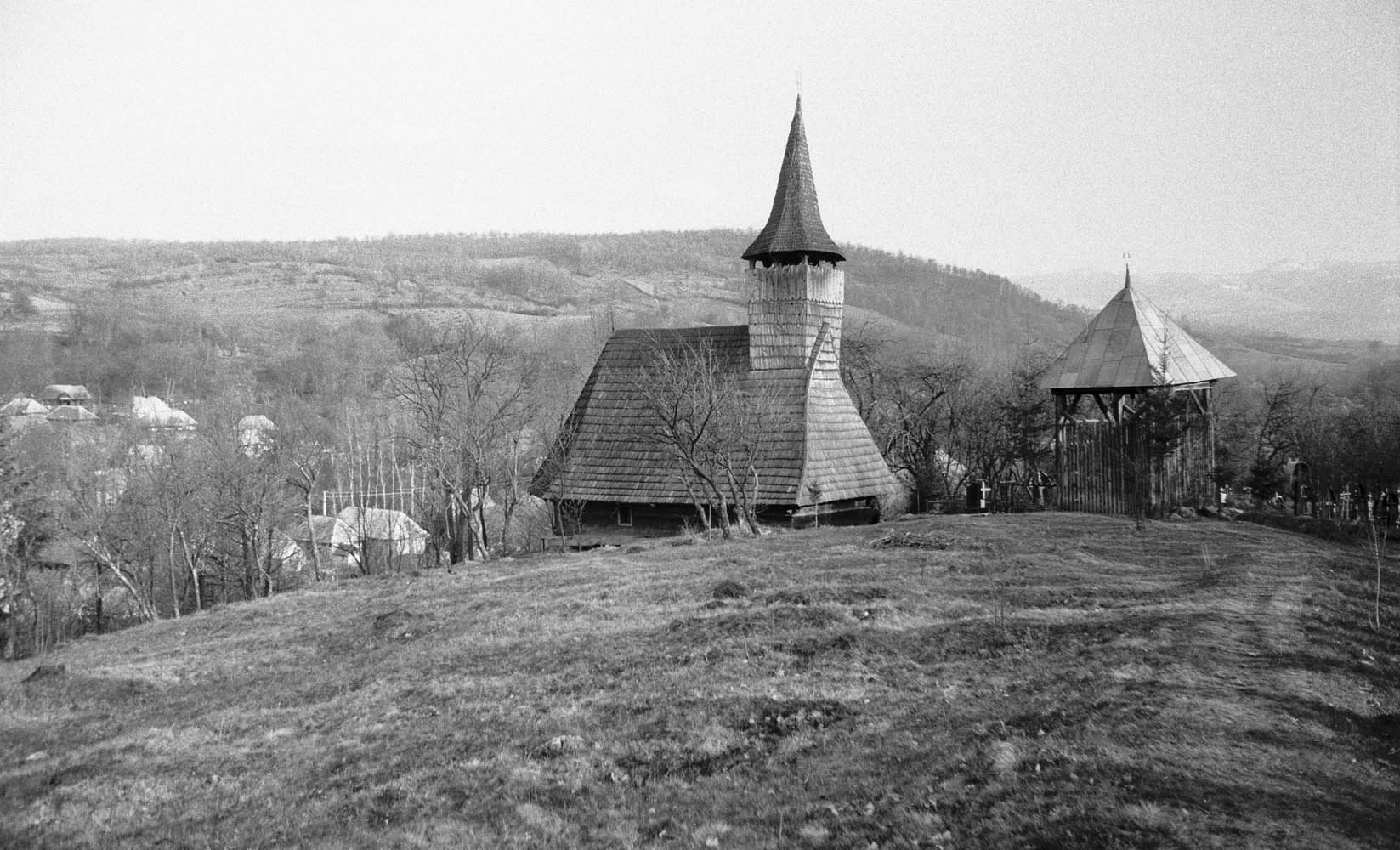
Perspective

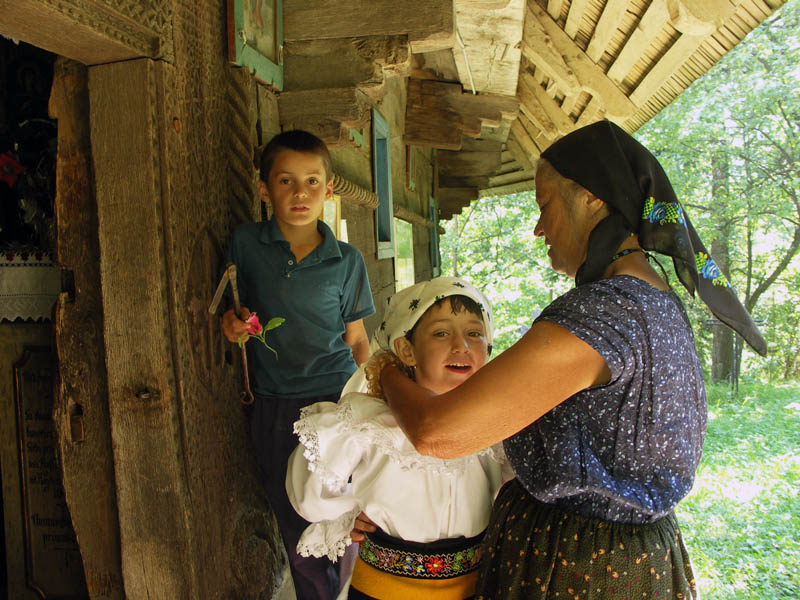
At the entrance

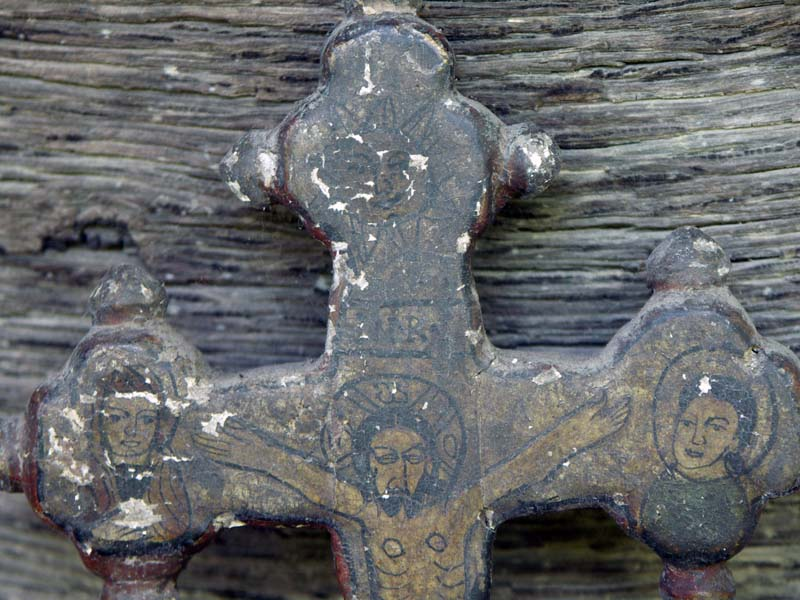
Handheld cross from the 17th century

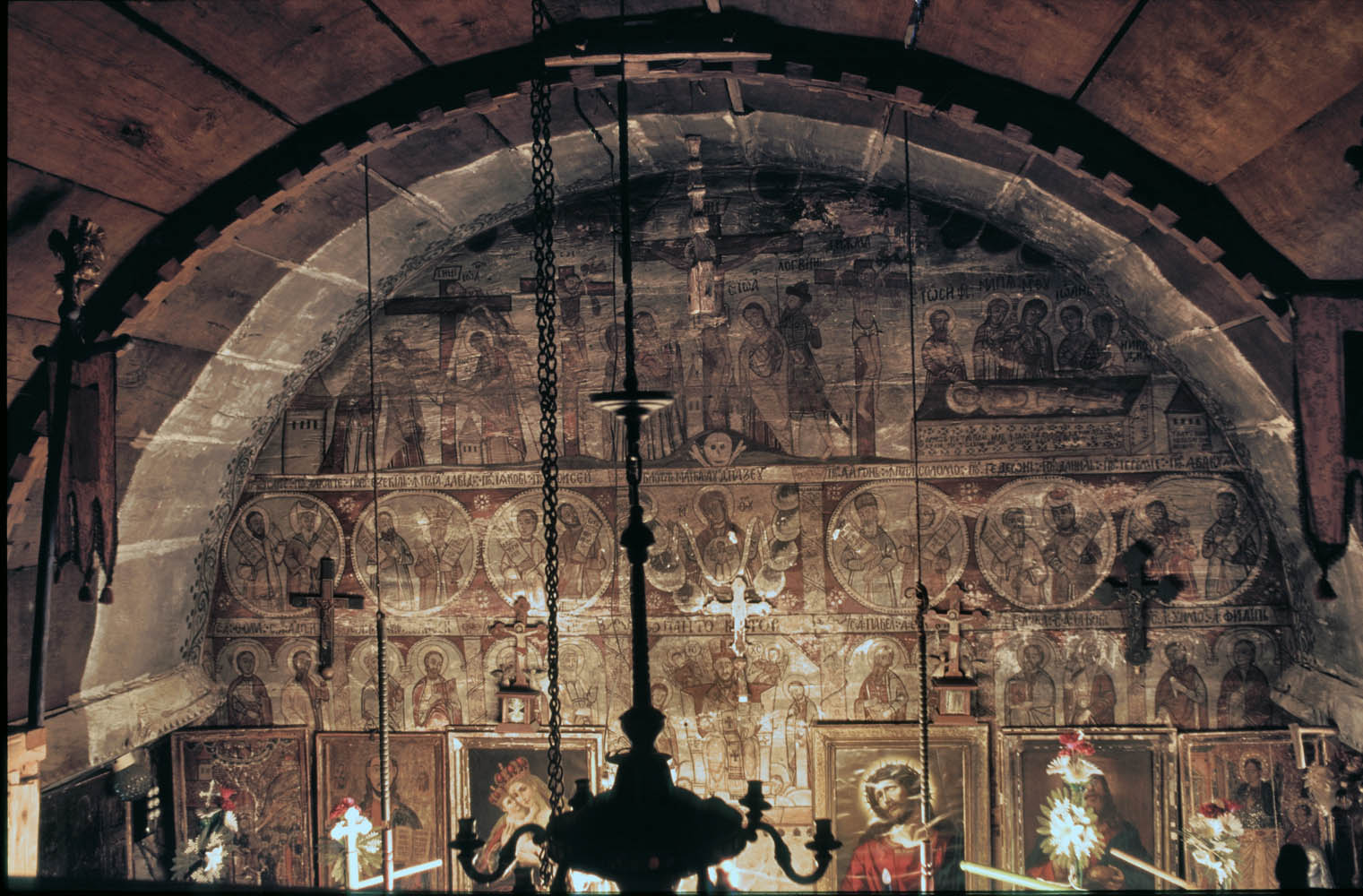
Interior view
