= Pârâul Băilor =

- Location within Romania

Location
- Country: Romania
- Counties: Bistrița-Năsăud County
- Villages: Valea Vinului, Rodna

Physical characteristics
- Source: Mount Ineu
  - location: Rodna Mountains
  - coordinates: 47°31′34″N 24°51′35″E
  - elevation: 1,504 m (4,934 ft)
- Mouth: Someșul Mare
  - location: Rodna
  - coordinates: 47°25′11″N 24°49′01″E
  - elevation: 522 m (1,713 ft)
- Length: 14 km (8.7 mi)
- Basin size: 62 km^{2} (24 sq mi)

Basin features
- Progression: Someșul Mare→ Someș→ Tisza→ Danube→ Black Sea
- Tributaries
  - right: Pârâul Roșu

The Pârâul Băilor is a right tributary of the river Someșul Mare in Romania. It discharges into the Someșul Mare in Rodna. Its length is 14 km (8.7 mi) and its basin size is 62 km^{2} (24 sq mi).
