= Prislop Pass =

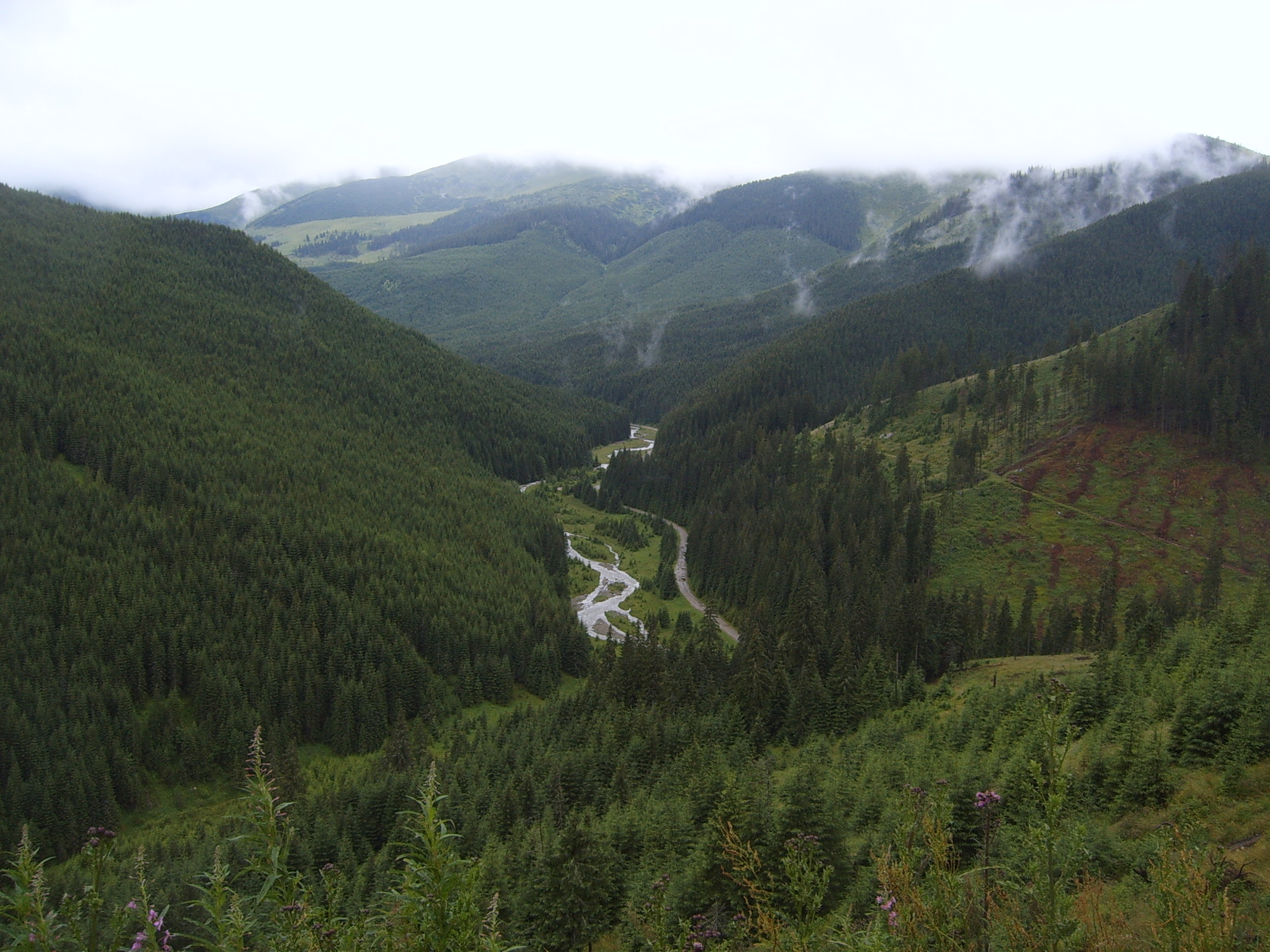

- Location within Romania
- Elevation: 1,416 metres (4,646 ft)
- Traversed by: DN18

Third Approach
- Location: Romania
- Range: Eastern Carpathians
- Coordinates: 47°36.5′N 24°51.3′E

Prislop Pass (Romanian: Pasul Prislop) is a mountain pass in northern Romania, connecting the historical regions of Maramureș and Bukovina over the Rodna Mountains, in the Eastern Carpathians.

The Prislop Pass is situated at an elevation of 1,416 metres (4,646 feet). The closest city is Borșa. It is crossed by national road DN18, which starts in Baia Mare and ends in Iacobeni, Suceava.

== See also ==
- List of highest paved roads in Europe
- List of mountain passes
