= Pietrosul Peak =

Highest point in the Rodna Mountains, Romania

Pietrosul Rodnei
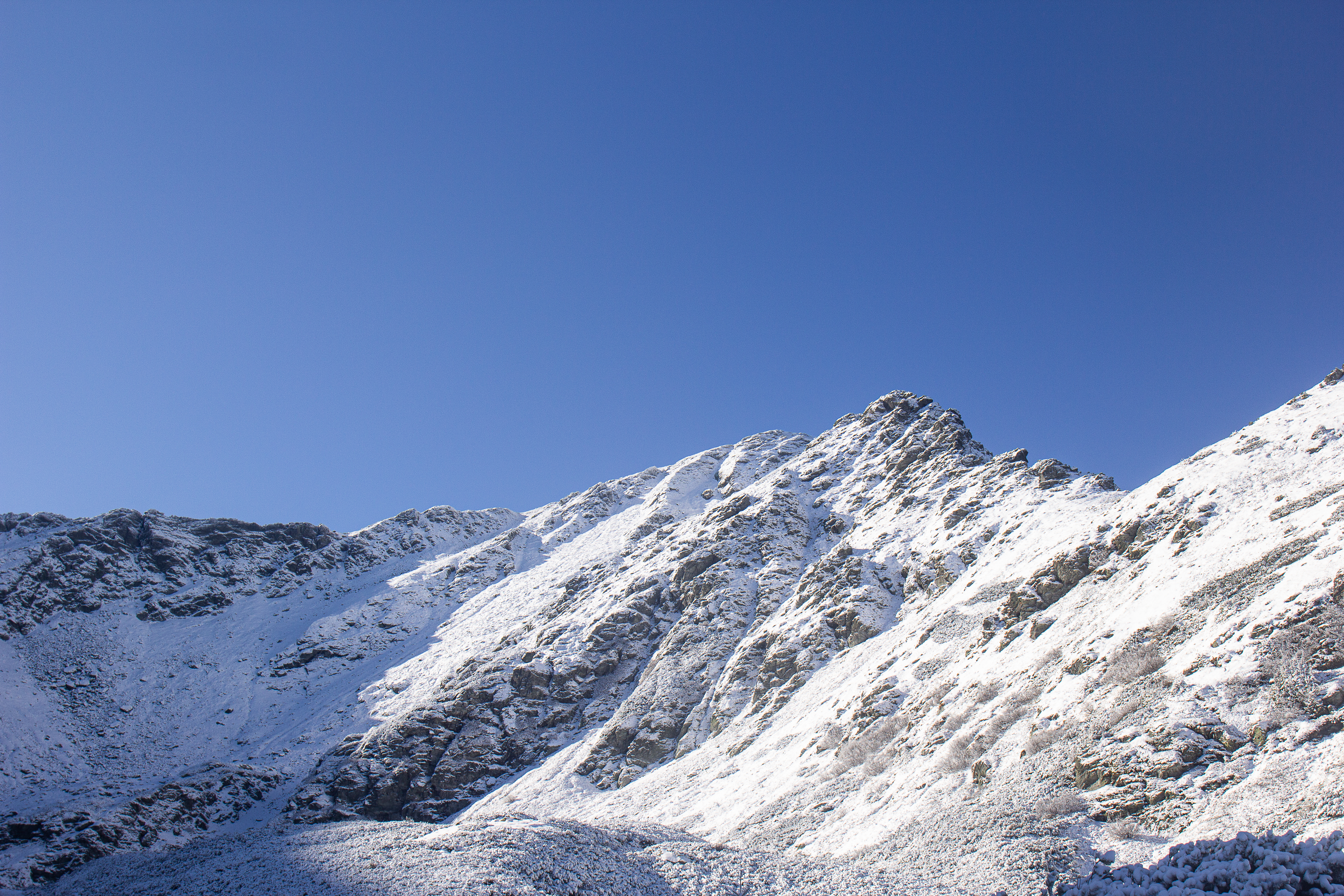

Highest point
- Elevation: 2,303 m (7,556 ft)
- Prominence: 1,578 m (5,177 ft)
- Coordinates: 47°35′50″N 24°38′01″E

Geography
- Countries: Romania
- Counties: Maramureș and Bistrița-Năsăud
- Parent range: Rodna Mountains

Pietrosul Rodnei is the highest peak of the Rodna Mountains in northern Romania, as part of the Eastern Carpathians chain. It is located on the border between Maramureș County and Bistrița-Năsăud County. Pietrosul Mare Nature Reserve encompasses the Pietrosul Peak and the surrounding area.

== Name ==
The name Pietrosul comes from the Romanian word piatră (“stone/rock”), pietros ("made of stone/rock"), essentially conveying "full of stones".

== Geography ==
Pietrosul is the highest peak of the Rodna Mountains and, at an elevation of 2,303 metres, the highest peak in the Eastern Carpathians.

The Pietrosul area features alpine and glacial landforms, including glacial cirques and glacial lakes. One of them, Lacul Iezer (Iezer Lake), is a glacial lake situated at 1825 m elevation. It has a surface of 3450 square meters and a maximum depth of 2.5 meters. Additional, much smaller glacial lakes are Buhaescu I, Buhaescu II, Buhaescu III, and Buhaescu IV.

== Flora and fauna ==
Pietrosul supports a variety of alpine flora and fauna along four vegetation belts: Fagus forest, Abies forest, dwarf Pinus shrubs and alpine grasslands.

Among the animal species inhabiting the mounrain are marmots. In May and June the landscape is full with blooming pink rhododendrons (mountain peony or "bujor de munte").

Pietrosul lies within the Rodna Mountains Biosphere Reserve, designated by UNESCO in 1979.

== Religious communities ==
Schitul Pietroasa or "Mănăstirea Borșa Pietroasa" is a small Orthodox monastic community/hermitage founded in 2007 at about 1,000 m elevation directly below Pietrosul.
