= Ineu Peak =

Mountain in Romania

Coordinates: 47°30′39″N 24°52′41″E

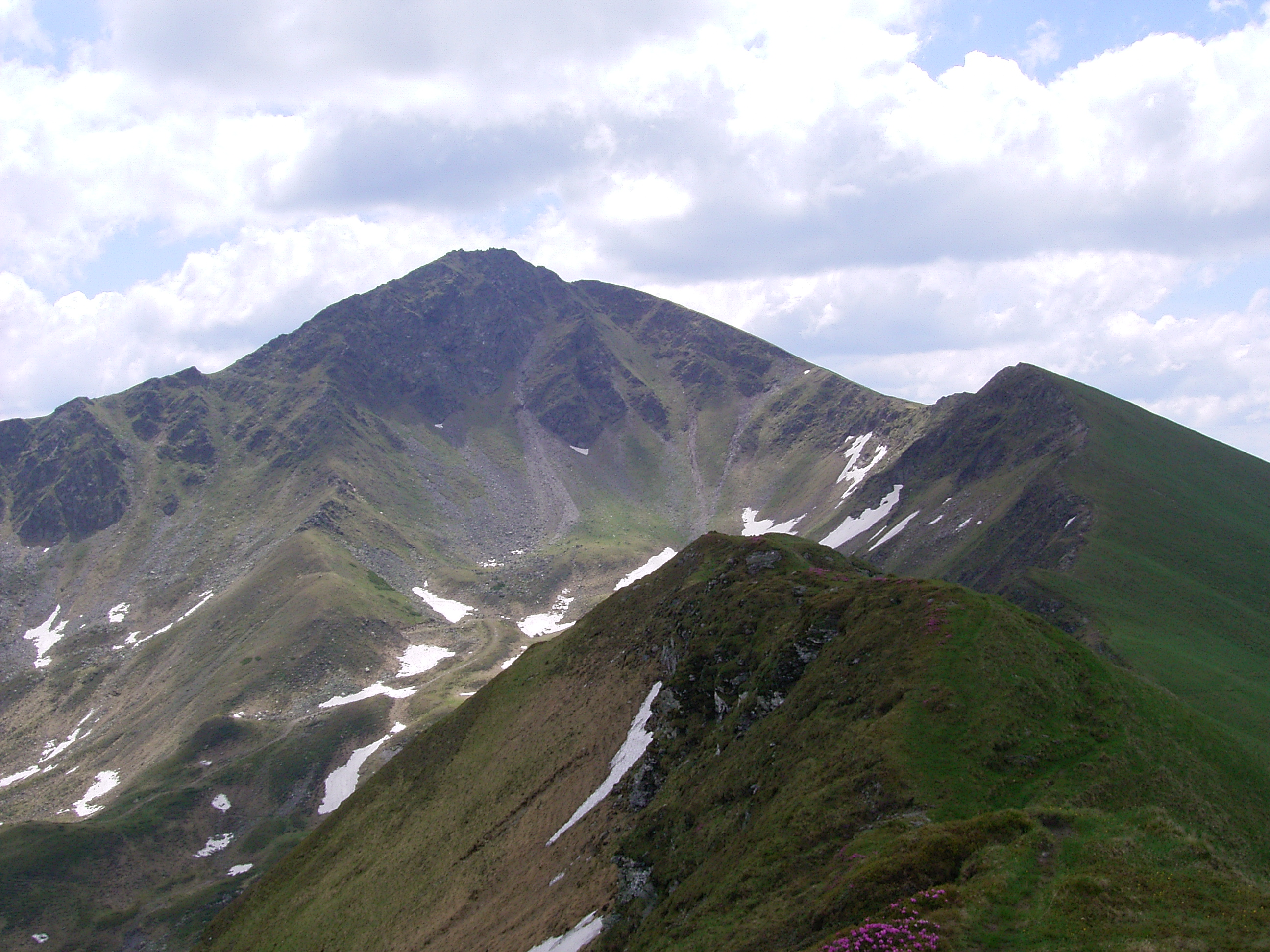
Vârful Ineu

Ineu (also Inău) is a peak in the Rodna Mountains, Romania with an elevation of 2,279 m (7,477 ft). It is the second peak in height after Pietrosul Rodnei which has an elevation of 2,303 m (7,556 ft).

Ineu Peak belongs to the Ineu–Lala Mixed Reservation, within the Rodna Mountains National Park.
