= Maramureș =

Maramureș Maramureș (Romanian) Мараморош (Rusyn) Мармарощина (Ukrainian) Máramaros (Hungarian)
- Historical region of Central Europe
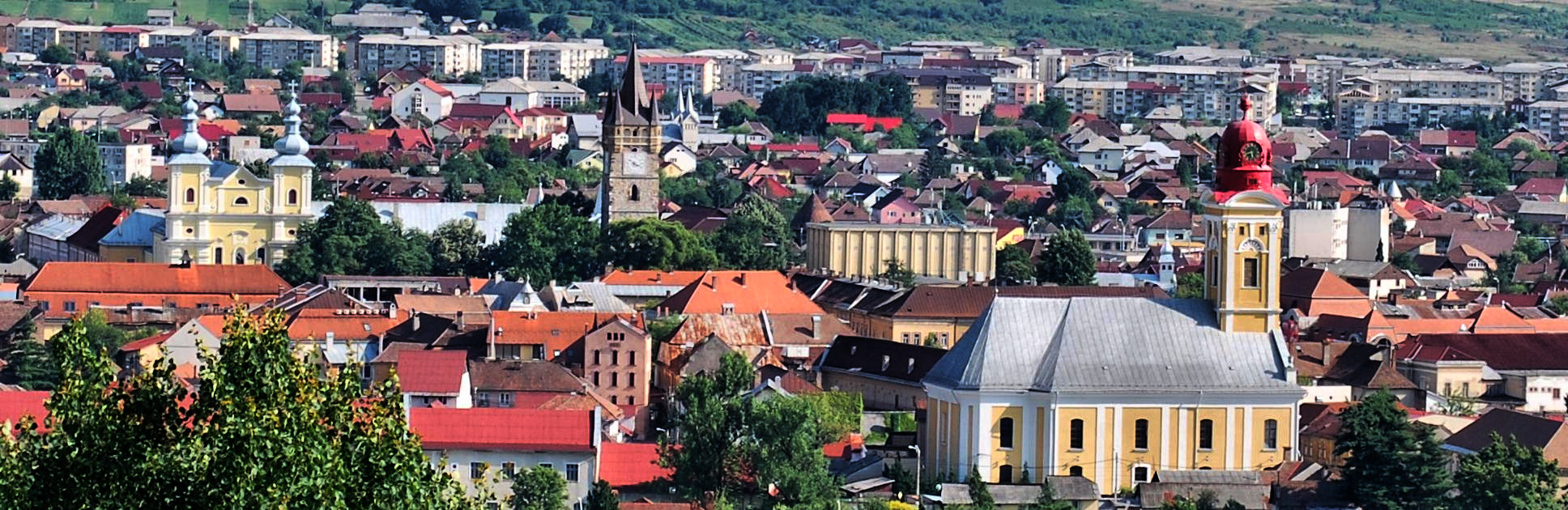
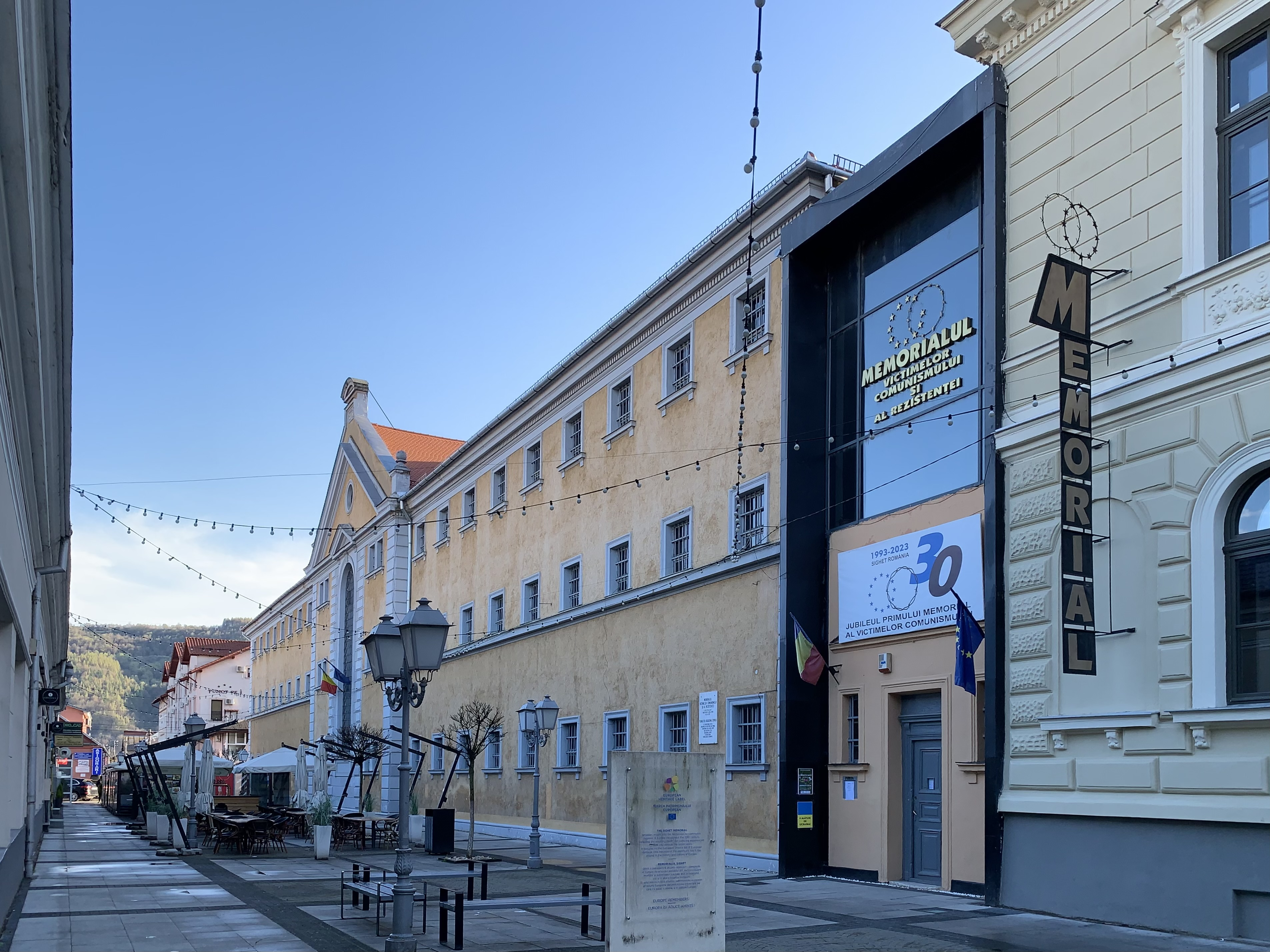
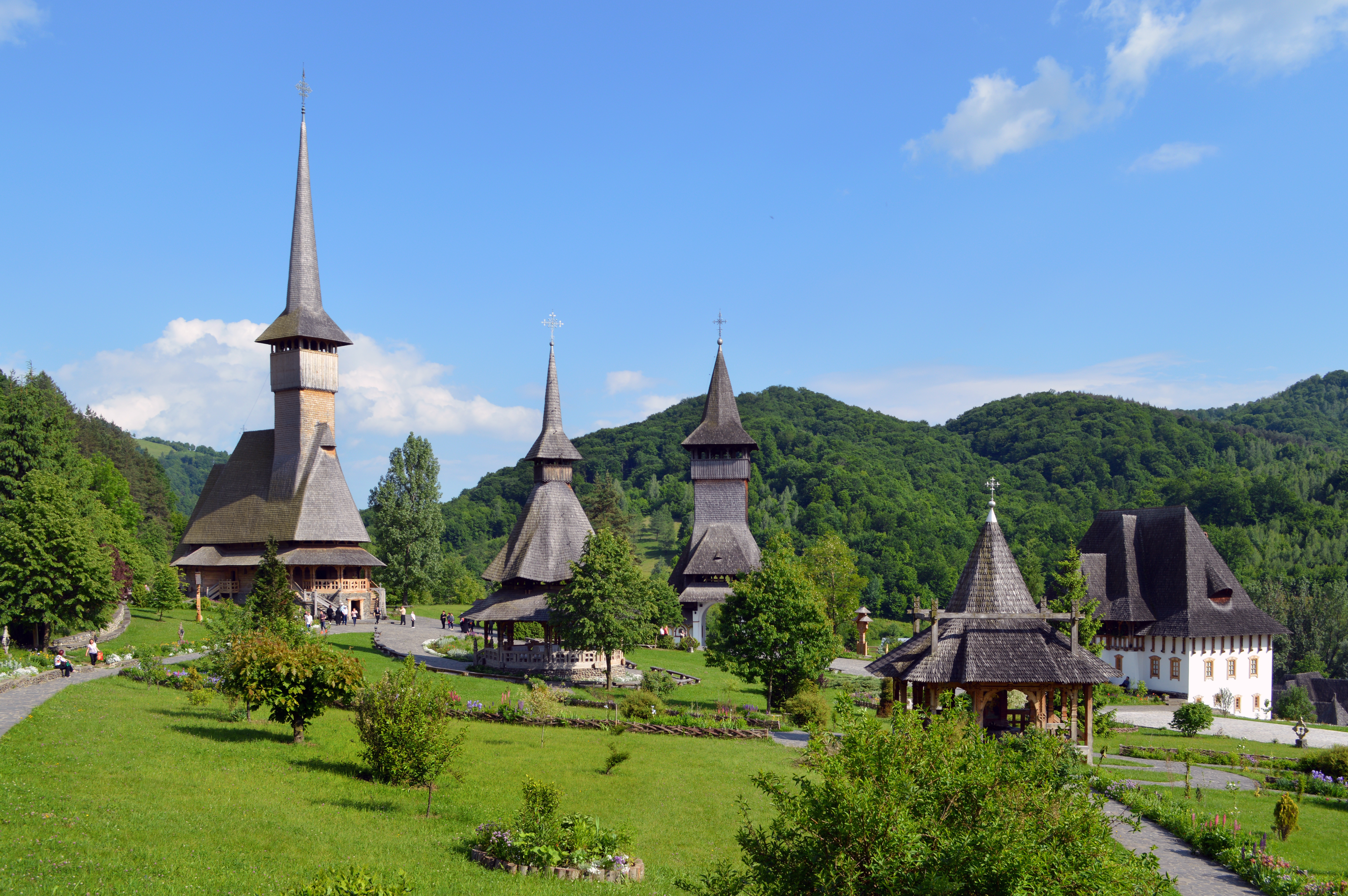
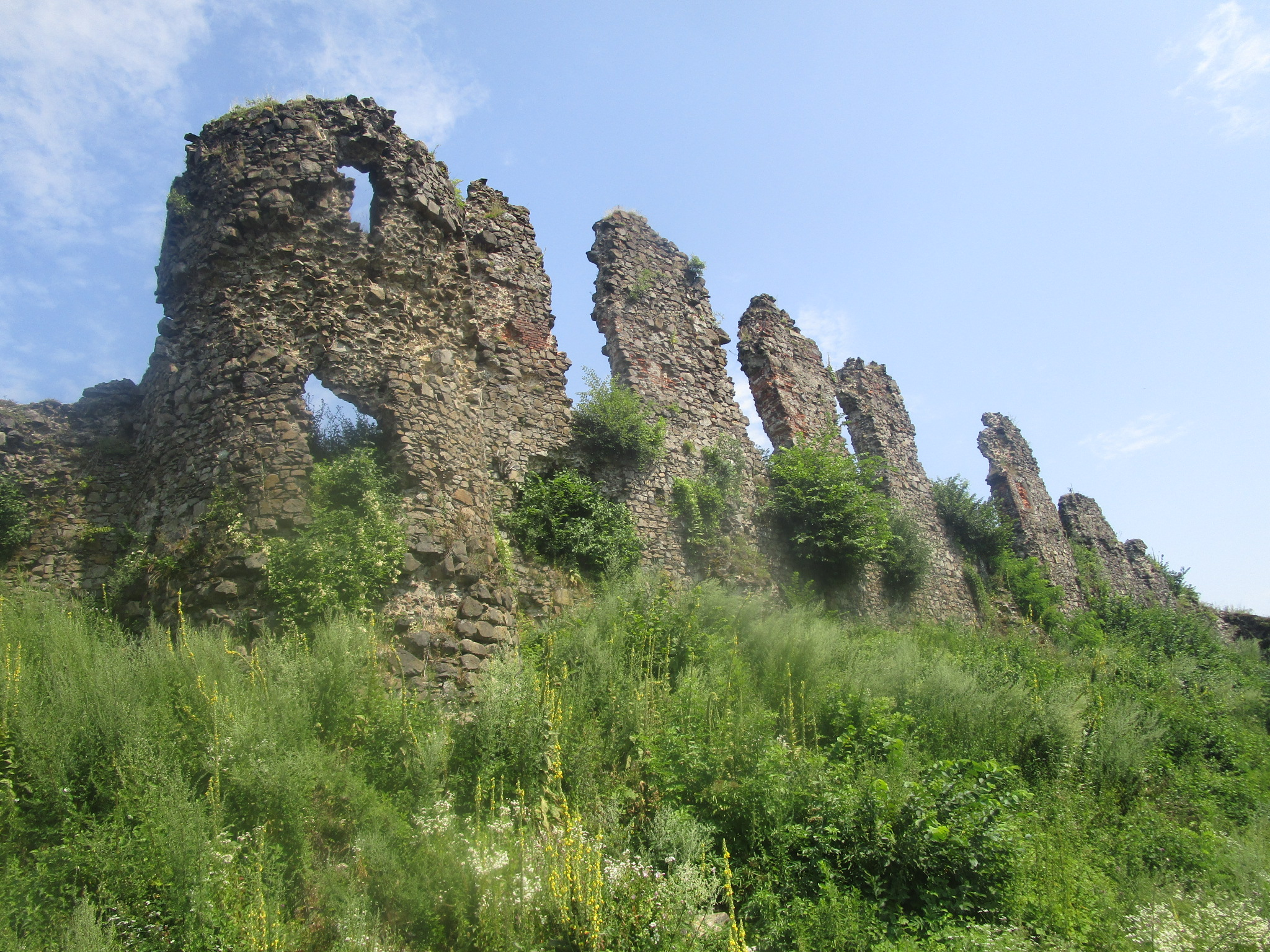
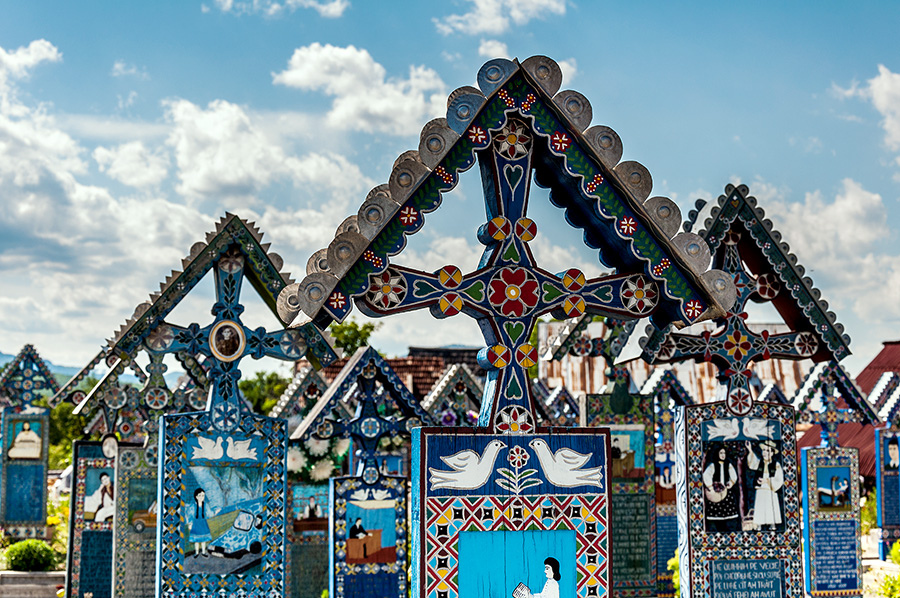
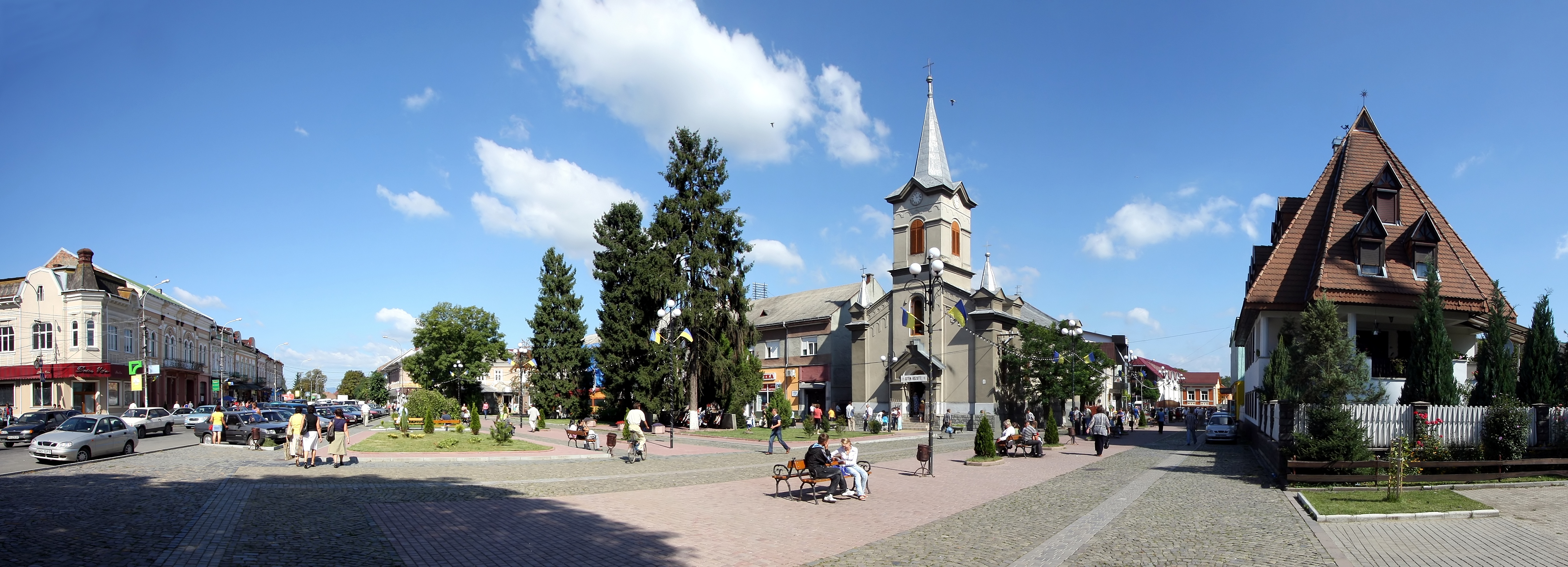
- Baia Mare Panorama Sighet Prison Bârsana Monastery Khust Castle Merry Cemetery Tiachiv Panorama

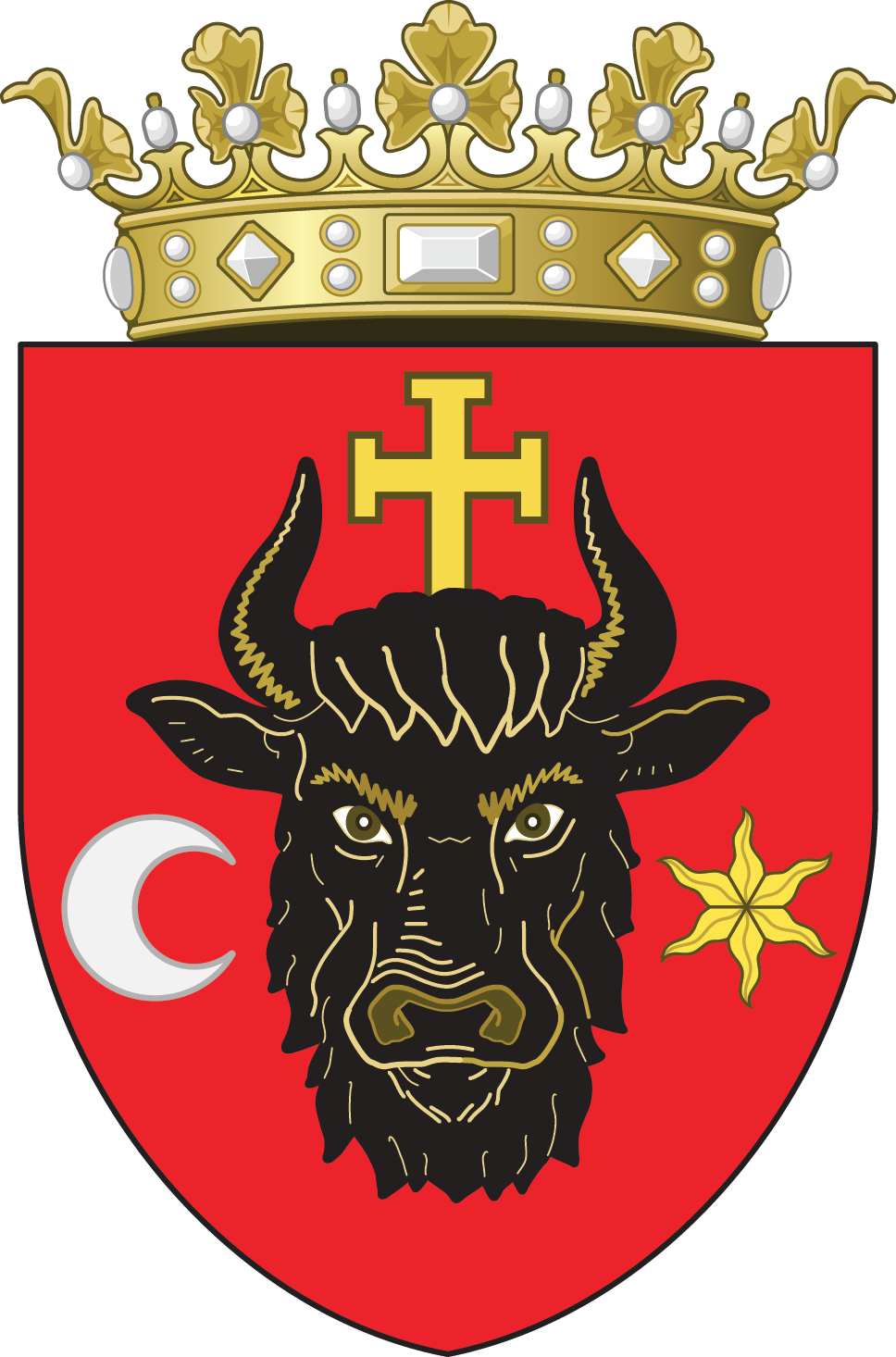
- Coat of arms

- Country: Romania; Ukraine
- Largest city: Baia Mare
- Time zone: UTC+2 (EET)
  - Summer (DST): UTC+3 (EEST)

Maramureș (Romanian: Maramureș pronounced [maraˈmureʃ]; Rusyn: Мараморош; Ukrainian: Мармарощина, romanized: Marmaroshchyna; Hungarian: Máramaros [ˈmaːrɒmɒroʃ]) is a geographical, historical and cultural region in northern Romania and western Ukraine. It is situated in the northeastern Carpathians, along parts of the upper Tisza River drainage basin; it covers the Maramureș Depression and the surrounding Carpathian mountains.

Alternatively, the term Maramureș is also used for the Maramureș County of Romania, which contains the southern section of the historical region.

== Name in other languages ==
Alternative names for Maramureș include Ukrainian: Мармарощина (Marmaroshchyna), Rusyn: Мараморош (Maramoroš), Russian: Мармарош (Marmarosh), Hungarian: Máramaros, German: Maramuresch or Marmarosch and Latin: Marmatia. In Yiddish it is מאַרמאַראָש.

== Geography ==
Maramureș is a valley enclosed by the Oaș, Gutâi, Țibleș and Rodnei mountains (the northern section of the Inner Eastern Carpathians) to the west and south, the Maramureș Mountains and the central section of the Outer Eastern Carpathians to the east and north. The valley is drained through a narrow opening, the Khust Gate, at Khust. Several dozen small mountain rivers and creeks flow into the river Tisa. It is forested and not easily accessible.

The limits of the region are between the parallels of 47°33' N and 47°02' N and the meridians of 23°15' E and 25°03' E. Maramureș represents one of the largest depressions in the Carpathians, covering an area of about 10,000 km^{2}.

Its length from Khust to Prislop Pass is about 150 km and width from North to South is up to 80 km.

The main mountain passes linking Maramureș with the neighboring regions are high and in the past were hardly accessible in the winter. The Prislop Pass (1,416 m high) links the east of the region with Moldavia, Dealul Ștefăniței (1,254 m) links the south to Transylvania, the Pintea Pass (987 m) towards Baia Mare, Fărgău (587 m) in the west links the region to Oaș Country, while Frasini Pass (Yasinia; 931 m) links the north of the region to Galicia.

The mountains surrounding this region occupy more than half of the area. A few peaks reach above 2,000 m, such as Pietrosul (2,303 m) in the Rodna Mountains to the south and Hovârla (2,061 m) in Muntele Negru (Cernahora) to the north.

The heavy forested mountains sustain many protected species of plants, such as yew (Taxus baccata), larch (Larix decidua), Swiss pine (Pinus cembra), edelweiss (Leontopodium alpinum); and animals, such as lynx (Lynx lynx), chamois (Rupicapra rupicapra), alpine marmot (Marmota marmota), golden eagle (Aquila chrysaetos), and capercaillie (Tetrao urogallus).

The last wisent from present-day Romania territory, a symbol of Maramureș, was hunted to extinction in 1852. Lostrița, a local variety of salmon, still live in the mountain rivers.

Several protected areas have been created in Maramureș. The Rodna Mountains National Park was designated in 1990, the Maramureș Mountains Natural Park in 2004, and there are many other caves, gorges, cliff formations, and lakes which are officially-protected areas.

== History ==
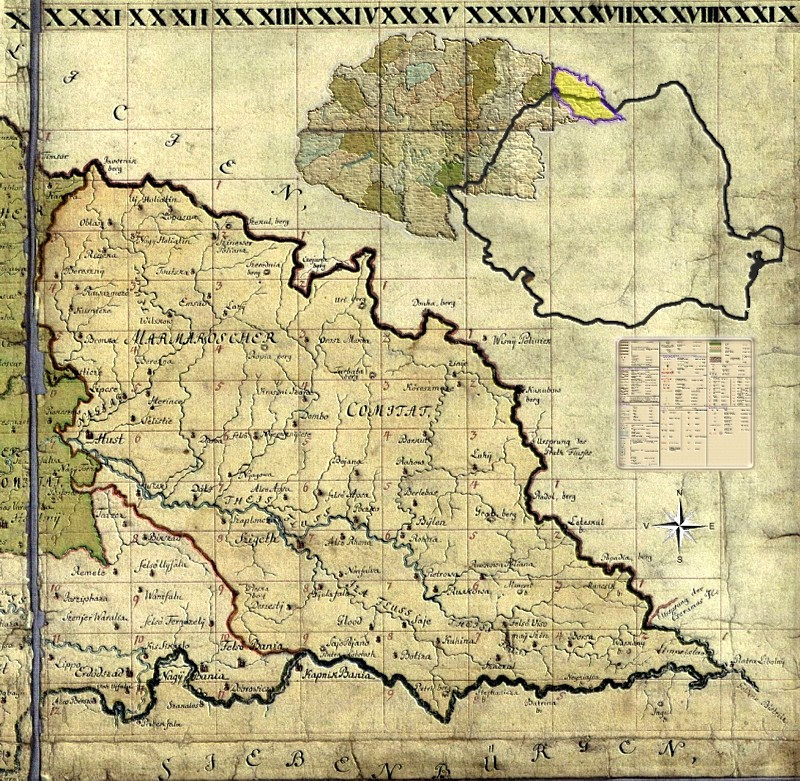
Marmaroscher Comitat on the map of the Habsburg Kingdom of Hungary, 1780–1784. The present-day borders of Romania are projected to the historical map.

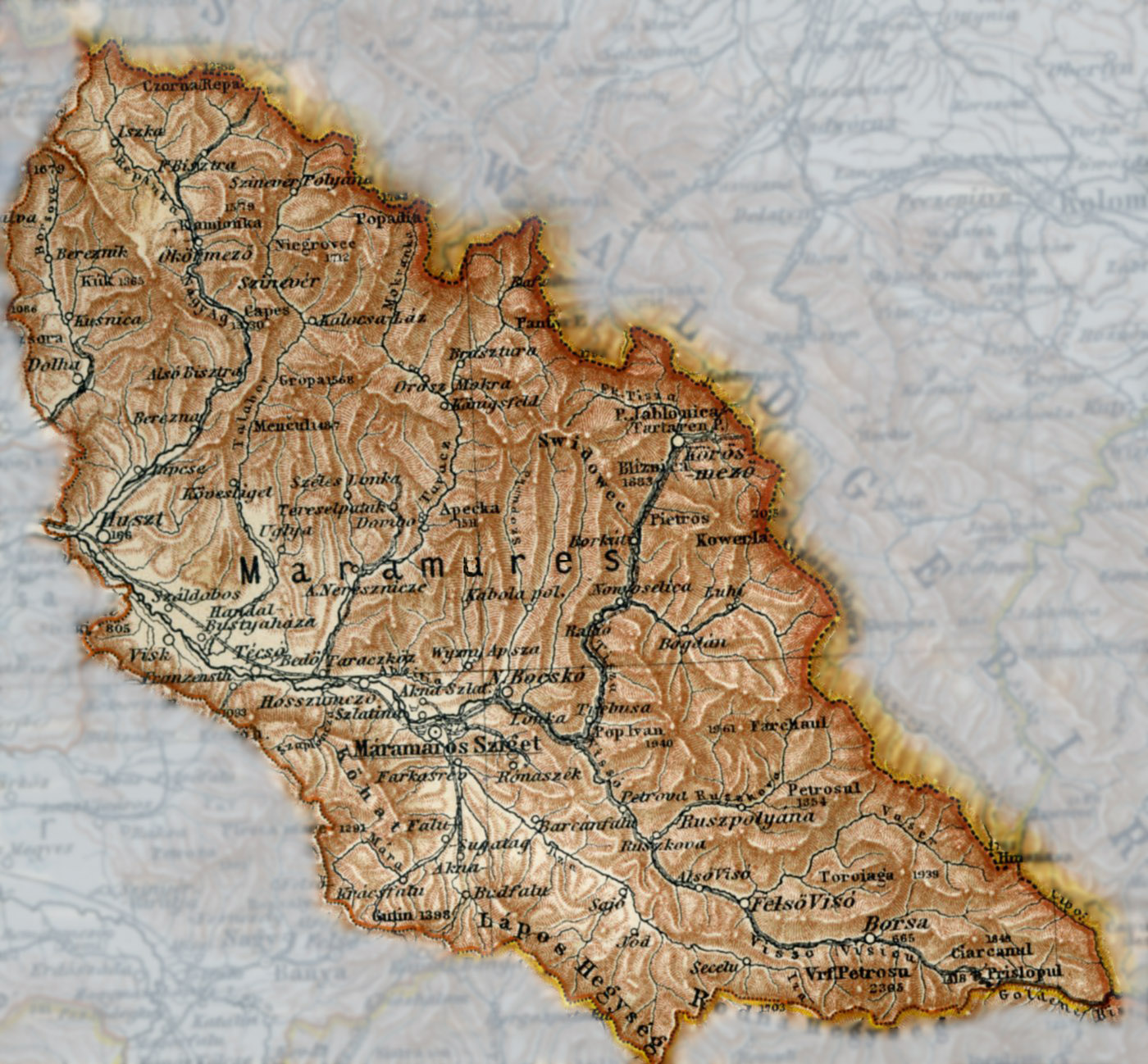
Máramaros County (Hungarian: Máramaros vármegye; Romanian: Comitatul Maramureș; Ukrainian: Комітат Марамарош), 1905

In ancient times, this area was settled by Celts, Dacians, Sarmatians, Germanic peoples and Akatziri. In the first century BC, it was part of the Dacian Kingdom under Burebista, while in the early Middle Ages, it was ruled by the Hunnic Empire, the Kingdom of the Gepids, the Kingdom of the Avars, the White Croatia, Hungarians and even the Kievan Rus'.

The territory was part of the Kingdom of Hungary from the 11th century and was nominally divided between the Gyepű border region, comitatus of Szatmár and comitatus of Borsova. Initially, the Romanian inhabitants of the region were allowed to preserve their political organization, the Voivodeship of Maramureș, divided into many small autonomous areas. The King long struggled to convince the Voivodes to accept the title of Count, with the implied loss of independence in political and financial matters. During the Middle Ages, the people in many mountain villages, where each family by definition had a considerable domain, were called nameși, meaning free peasants taking pride in their family. The origin of the word is disputed: in the Kingdom of Hungary, free people possessing land were called nemes in Hungarian. In Romanian neam means extended family, but this name's root is better explained as deriving from the Greek verb νέμω némō, meaning to divide something (mainly land) into parts and give it to νοµεῖς nomeîs (people with the right to use it, either to rent it or use it for free; singular νομεύς nomeús). The region was reorganized to Máramaros County in the 14th century.

In the 16th century, the Kingdom of Hungary was invaded by the Ottoman Empire, and the area came under administration of the semi-independent Ottoman Principality of Transylvania. Later (in the late 17th century) it came under the administration of the Habsburg monarchy (which became the Austrian Empire in 1804). During Habsburg administration, the region was initially part of the Partium lands of the Habsburg Principality of Transylvania, but was later (in 1732) transferred to the Habsburg Kingdom of Hungary. In 1867, the Austrian Empire was transformed into the dual monarchy of Austria-Hungary and the region was included in the Transleithanian or Hungarian part of the Monarchy.

After the First World War, the region was divided between Romania and the Czechoslovak region of Carpathian Ruthenia, with the border following that of the short-lived Hutsul Republic. In March 1939 Hungary annexed Carpathian Ruthenia and in August 1940 annexed the region of Northern Transylvania, which included southern Maramureș, from Romania; the territories remained under Hungarian control until 1944. After World War II, the southern section returned to Romania and is now part of Maramureș County; the northern section was incorporated into the Soviet Union as part of the Ukrainian SSR and is now part of Zakarpattia Oblast of independent Ukraine.

== People ==
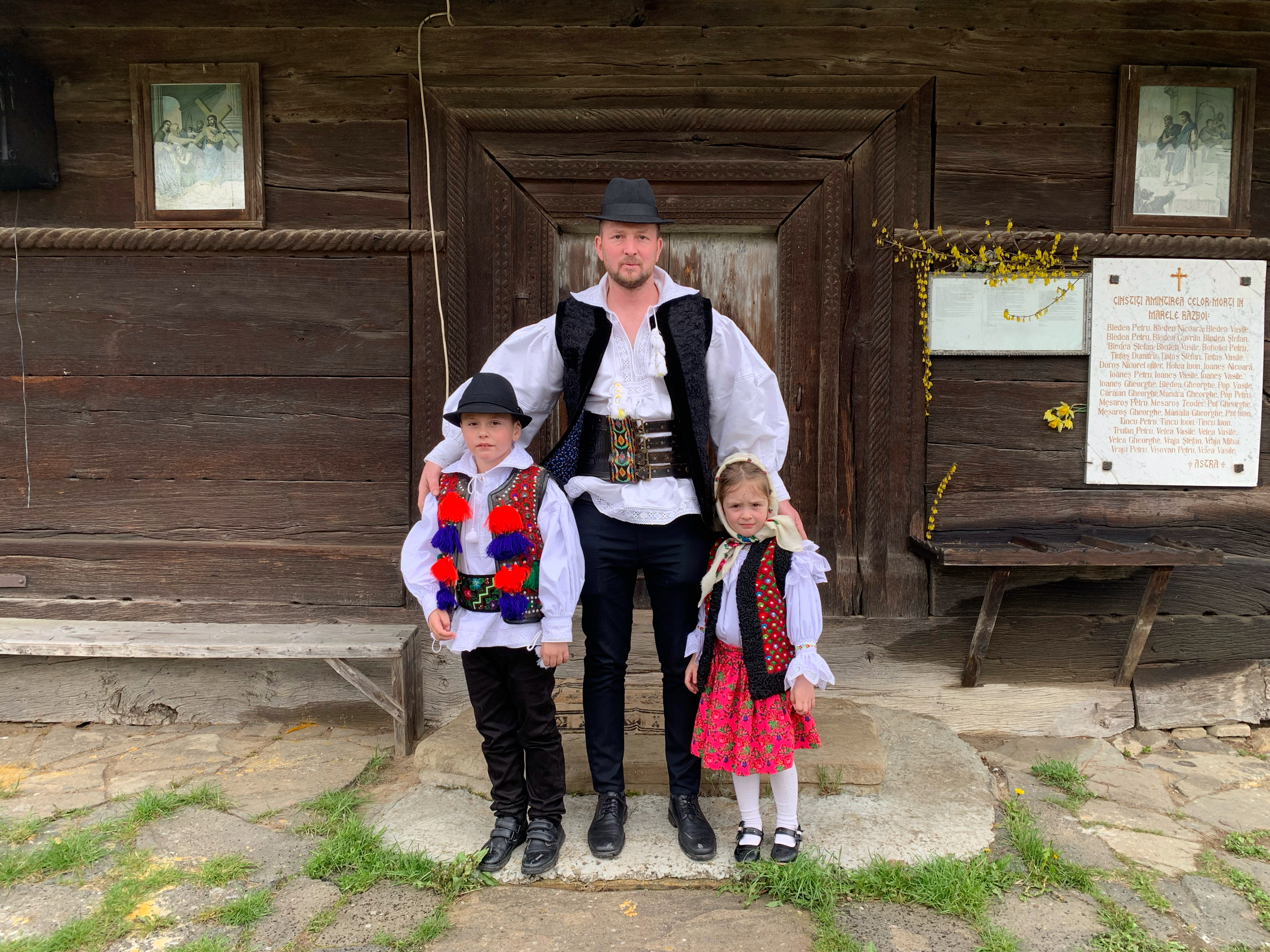
Romanians wearing Maramureș traditional clothing at a church in Sat-Șugatag

In the southern area, the majority of the population are Romanians. There are also some Hungarians, Rusyns, Ukrainians, Zipser Germans, Jews, and Roma. In the northern area, the majority are Ukrainians, with smaller Romanian, Hungarian and German communities.

In the northern area most people speak Hutsul dialect of Ukrainian language, while in the southern area most speak Romanian, which is why the region was split into two parts. Since the 1940s there have been villages cut in two by the state border. There are some villages in the north (within Ukraine) that have a sizeable Romanian population, as well as some villages in Romania that have a sizeable Ukrainian and/or Rusyn population.

== See also ==
- Wooden churches of Maramureș
- Hutsul Republic
