= Festuca porcii =

Scientific classification
- Kingdom: Plantae
- Clade: Tracheophytes
- Clade: Angiosperms
- Clade: Monocots
- Clade: Commelinids
- Order: Poales
- Family: Poaceae
- Subfamily: Pooideae
- Genus: Festuca
- Species: F. porcii

Binomial name
- Festuca porcii Hack.

Species of grass

Festuca porcii is a species of grass which can be found in Central, Eastern, and southeastern parts of Europe.

== Description ==
The plant is perennial and caespitose with 45–90-centimetre-long (18–35 in) culms. The ligule is going around the eciliate membrane. Leaf-blades are flat and are 0.7–1.2 millimetres [mm] (0.028–0.047 in) broad, while their venation have 13 vascular bundles. The panicle is open, ovate, inflorescenced and is 13–18 cm long (5.1–7.1 in) with pilose branches. Spikelets are oblong, solitary, 9.4 mm (0.37 in) long, and carry pedicelled fertile spikelets whose florets have a diminished apex.

The glumes are chartaceous, lanceolate and keelless. Their size and apexes are different though; the upper one is obovate and is 4.9 mm (0.19 in) long with an obtuse apex, while the lower one has an acute apex. Fertile lemma is chartaceous, lanceolate, keelless, and is 6.2 mm (0.24 in) long. Lemma itself is muticous with acuminate apex. Flowers have a hairy ovary and three stamens that are 3 mm (0.12 in) long. The fruits are caryopses with an additional pericarp that is ellipsoid, while the hilum is linear.
