= Rodna =

- Commune
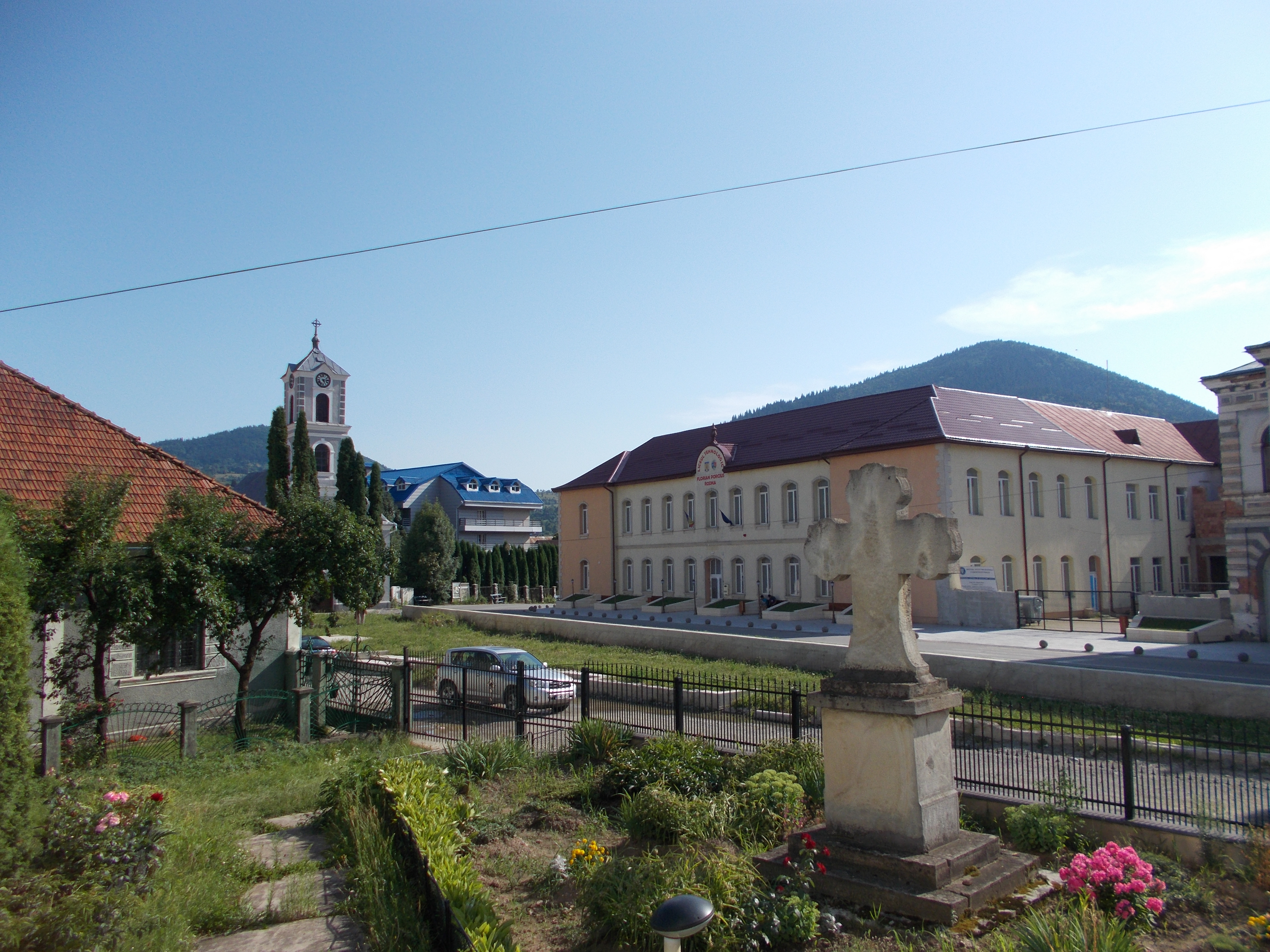
- Downtown Rodna

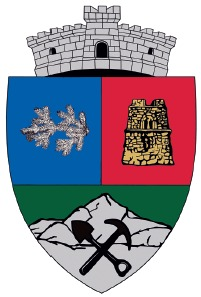
- Coat of arms

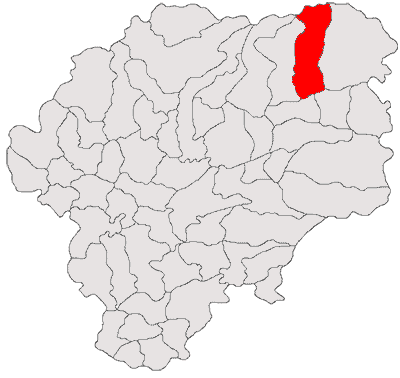
- Location in Bistrița-Năsăud County

- Location in Romania
- Coordinates: 47°25′18″N 24°48′44″E
- Country: Romania
- County: Bistrița-Năsăud

Government
  - Mayor (2020–2024): Valentin Iosif Grapini (PSD)
- Area: 224.15 km^{2} (86.54 sq mi)
- Elevation: 584 m (1,916 ft)
- Population (2021-12-01): 6,003
  - Density: 26.78/km^{2} (69.36/sq mi)
- Time zone: UTC+02:00 (EET)
  - Summer (DST): UTC+03:00 (EEST)
- Postal code: 427245
- Area code: (+40) 02 63
- Vehicle reg.: BN
- Website: comunarodna.ro

Rodna (formerly Rodna Veche; Hungarian: Óradna or Radna; German: Altrodenau or Rodenau) is a commune in Bistrița-Năsăud County, Transylvania, Romania. It is composed of two villages, Rodna and Valea Vinului (Radnaborberek, formerly Borpatakhoz).

Its name is derived from a Slavic word, ruda, meaning "iron ore", originally being known as Rudna in 14th century documents.

== Geography ==
The commune is located in the northeastern part of Bistrița-Năsăud County, 50 km (31 mi) from the county seat, Bistrița, on the border with Maramureș County. It is situated at an altitude of 584 m (1,916 ft), on the southern slopes of the Rodna Mountains. The Rodna Mountains National Park is partly located on the administrative territory of the commune.

The Someșul Mare River, which has its source in the Rodna Mountains, flows east to west through Rodna village. The river Pârâul Băilor flows north to south through Valea Vinului village, discharging into the Someșul Mare in the center of Rodna village, near the ruins of the old tower.

Rodna village is crossed by the national road DN17D, which starts in Beclean, 70 km (43 mi) to the southwest, crosses the Carpathian Mountains through the Rotunda Pass, and ends in Fluturica, Suceava County, 34 km (21 mi) to the northeast.

== History ==
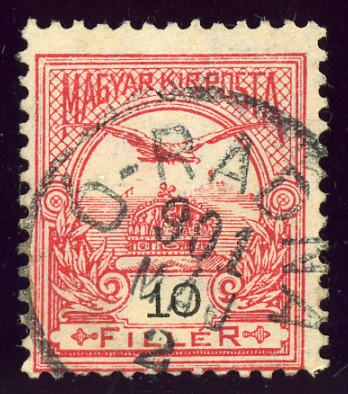
Kingdom of Hungary 10 fillér stamp, cancelled Ó-RADNA, in 1901

During the Late Middle Ages, the Transylvanian Saxon-inhabited village was sacked by the Mongols during their invasion of the Kingdom of Hungary. After 1570, the settlement became part of the Principality of Transylvania.

Between 1711 (Treaty of Szatmar) and 1918, Rodna was part of the Habsburg monarchy, province of Transylvania; in Transleithania after the compromise of 1867. A post-office was opened in 1856, later named Ó-Radna ("Old Rodna"). In 1876, the village became part of Beszterce-Naszód County.

In the aftermath of World War I, the Union of Transylvania with Romania was declared in December 1918. At the start of the Hungarian–Romanian War of 1918–1919, the locality passed under Romanian administration; after the Treaty of Trianon of 1920, it became part of the Kingdom of Romania. In 1925, Rodna became the seat of Plasa Rodna in Năsăud County. In August 1940, under the auspices of Nazi Germany, which imposed the Second Vienna Award, Hungary retook the territory of Northern Transylvania (which included Rodna) from Romania. Towards the end of World War II, however, the commune was taken back from Hungarian and German troops by Romanian and Soviet forces in October 1944, and reverted to Năsăud County.

In 1950, the commune became part of Rodna Region, while in 1952 it fell in the Năsăud raion of Cluj Region. In 1968, a new administrative law was adopted, and Rodna became part of Bistrița-Năsăud County.

== Natives ==
Historical population
Year	Pop.	±%
2002	6,313	—
2011	5,777	−8.5%
2021	6,003	+3.9%
Source: Census data

- Florian Porcius (1816–1906), botanist and administrator
- Francisc Zavoda (1927–2011), footballer
- Vasile Zavoda (1929–2014), football player and manager
- Louis Dolivet (1908-1989), publisher and film producer
