= Rodna Mountains =

Mountain range in northeast region of Romania

- Romanian: Munții Rodnei
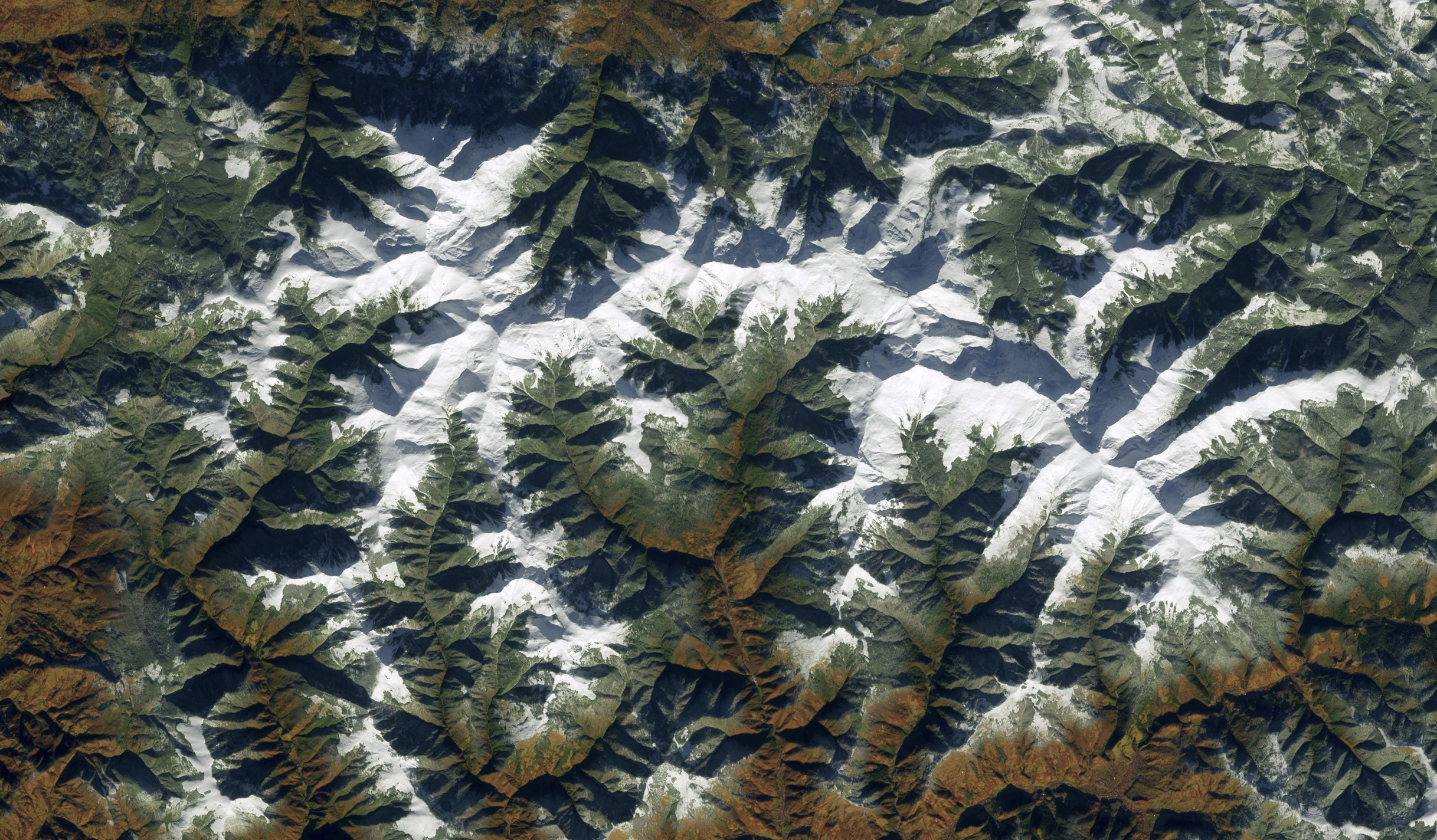
- The Rodna Mountains from space

Highest point
- Peak: Pietrosul Rodnei
- Elevation: 2,303 m (7,556 ft)
- Coordinates: 47.538°N 24.6972°E

Dimensions
- Length: 50 km (31 mi)
- Width: 25 km (16 mi)
- Area: 1,300 km^{2} (500 mi^{2})

Geography
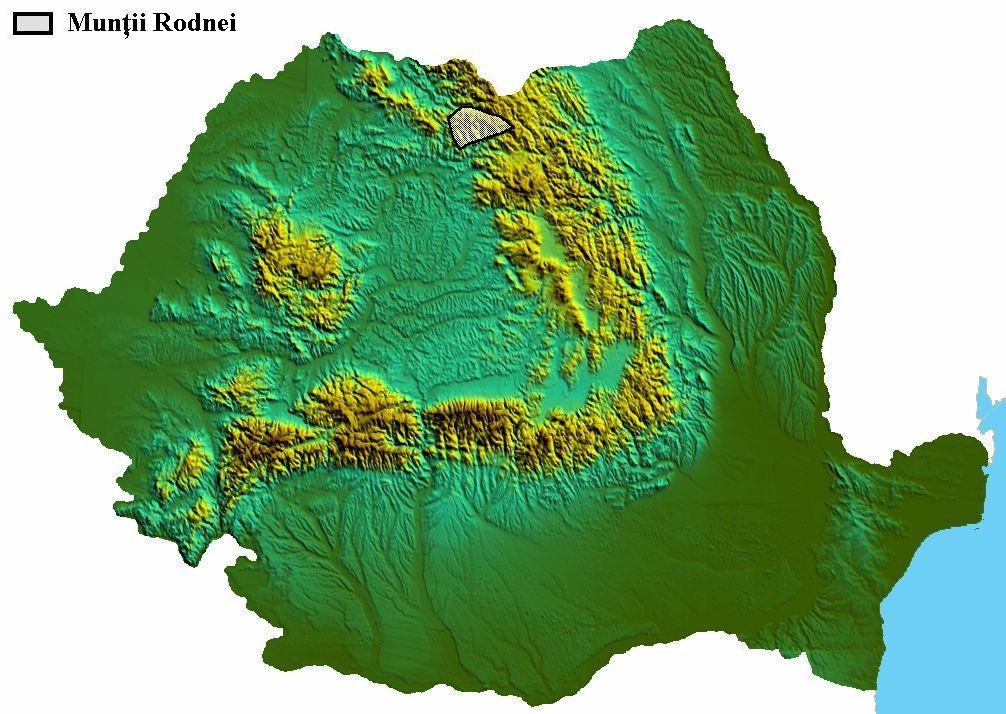
- Country: Romania
- Counties: Bistrița-Năsăud and Maramureș
- Parent range: Inner Eastern Carpathians

Rodna Mountains (Romanian: Munții Rodnei, Hungarian: Radnai-havasok) are a subdivision of the Inner Eastern Carpathians in northern Romania. The name comes from the nearby Rodna Veche village. At 2,303 metres (7,556 feet), Pietrosul Rodnei is the highest peak in all of the Eastern Carpathians.

The main ridge of the Rodna Mountains constitutes the natural border between Bistrița-Năsăud and Maramureș counties. From an administrative point of view, 80% of the massif's surface is in Bistrița-Năsăud and 20% in Maramureș.

== Geography ==
The Rodna Mountains have one of the longest continuous ridges in Romania, with over 50 km (31 mi) from west to east and a width of over 25 km (16 mi). The massif covers an area of about 1,300 km^{2} (500 sq mi). The highest points are Pietrosul Rodnei at 2,303 m, Ineu Peak at 2,279 m (7,477 ft), Ineuț Peak at 2,202 m (7,224 ft), Gârgalău Peak at 2,159 m (7,083 ft), and Omu Peak at 2,010 m (6,590 ft).

The mountains are most suited for hiking in summer and skiing in winter, and are especially famous for having snow late into the summer months (skiing is possible well into June, sometimes even July). While the ridge itself poses no difficulties, the challenge is the massive length of it, and the absence of drinkable water (except for a few puddles that are usually dry). A complete hike along the main Rodnei ridge takes between 3 and 5 days, depending on the weather and the endurance of the hiker.

The massif has some caves, notable among them being Izvorul Tăușoarelor, the deepest cave in Romania, reaching about 479 m (1,572 ft) beneath the surface and Jgheabul lui Zalion, 242 m (794 ft) deep.

== Climate ==
Climate data for Iezer (elevation 1785m, 2014–2026 normals , extremes 1961–present)
Month	Jan	Feb	Mar	Apr	May	Jun	Jul	Aug	Sep	Oct	Nov	Dec	Year
Record high °C (°F)	7.9 (46.2)	10.2 (50.4)	14.0 (57.2)	17.4 (63.3)	19.3 (66.7)	24.4 (75.9)	24.4 (75.9)	29.6 (85.3)	23.2 (73.8)	19.0 (66.2)	16.9 (62.4)	11.8 (53.2)	29.6 (85.3)
Mean daily maximum °C (°F)	−3.1 (26.4)	−1.8 (28.8)	0.4 (32.7)	4.3 (39.7)	9.2 (48.6)	14.6 (58.3)	15.5 (59.9)	16.6 (61.9)	11.7 (53.1)	6.9 (44.4)	3.1 (37.6)	−0.7 (30.7)	6.4 (43.5)
Daily mean °C (°F)	−6.1 (21.0)	−5.0 (23.0)	−2.8 (27.0)	1.1 (34.0)	5.7 (42.3)	10.8 (51.4)	11.8 (53.2)	12.8 (55.0)	8.4 (47.1)	3.8 (38.8)	0.1 (32.2)	−3.6 (25.5)	3.1 (37.5)
Mean daily minimum °C (°F)	−9.0 (15.8)	−8.1 (17.4)	−6.0 (21.2)	−2.2 (28.0)	2.2 (36.0)	7.1 (44.8)	8.2 (46.8)	9.0 (48.2)	5.0 (41.0)	0.6 (33.1)	−2.9 (26.8)	−6.5 (20.3)	−0.2 (31.6)
Record low °C (°F)	−27.5 (−17.5)	−29.0 (−20.2)	−27.3 (−17.1)	−18.0 (−0.4)	−10.7 (12.7)	−5.6 (21.9)	−1.5 (29.3)	−1.9 (28.6)	−10.5 (13.1)	−16.5 (2.3)	−21.0 (−5.8)	−23.3 (−9.9)	−29.0 (−20.2)
Average precipitation mm (inches)	99.0 (3.90)	88.1 (3.47)	81.0 (3.19)	92.4 (3.64)	144.0 (5.67)	154.3 (6.07)	149.0 (5.87)	94.8 (3.73)	107.7 (4.24)	92.5 (3.64)	102.5 (4.04)	101.6 (4.00)	1,306.9 (51.46)
Average precipitation days (≥ 1.0 mm)	14.9	11.7	12.4	11.2	14.6	14.5	13.5	8.7	10.0	10.6	11.7	13.7	147.5
Average snowy days	20.6	17.5	15.8	10.1	3.9	0.5	0	0	2.1	5.0	10.0	17.1	102.6
Source 1: Meteomanz (2014-2026), DirectMM
Source 2: Inversiuni Termice (1961-2000)

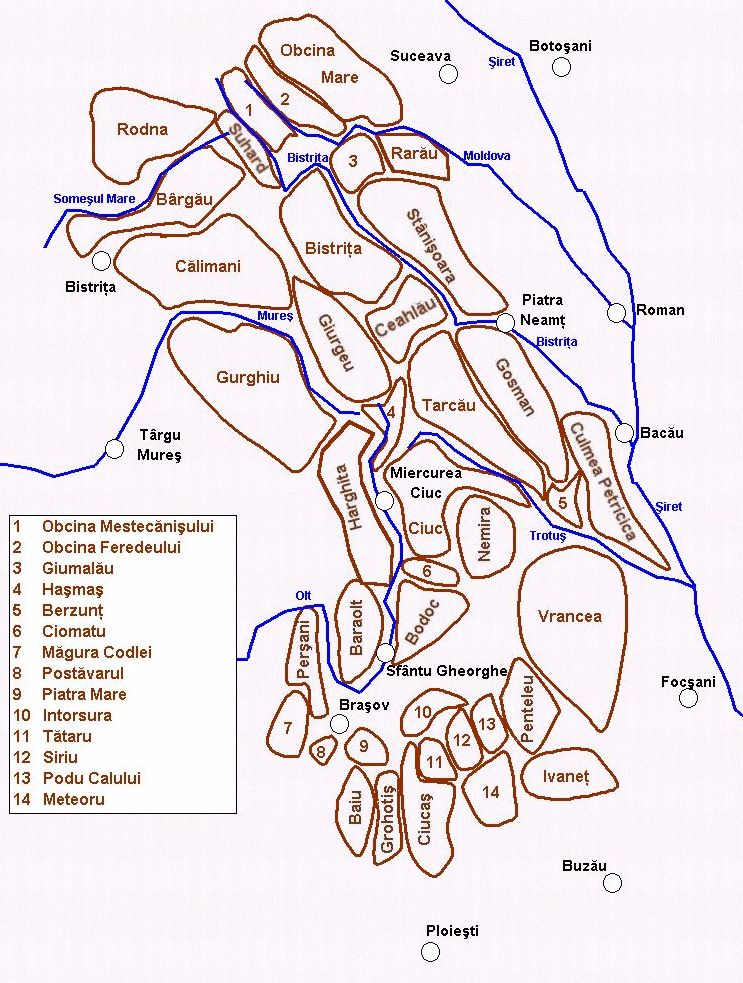
Map of the Eastern Carpathians, with the Rodna Mountains at the extreme north

== Location ==
The Rodna Mountains are partly in the region of Maramureș, in northern Romania, near the Romania–Ukraine border. To the north lies the town of Borșa and the village Moisei.

To the west the massif ends at the Șetref Pass (817 m (2,680 ft)), which connects it to the Transylvanian Plateau.

To the east are the Suhard Mountains; the river Bistrița has its source here, in a cirque at the foot of the Gârgalău Peak. The Prislop Pass (1,416 m (4,646 ft)) and the Rotunda Pass (1,271 m (4,170 ft)) connect the Rodna Mountains to Western Moldavia.

To the south lie the villages Rodna, Șanț, Maieru, and Anieș and the town of Sângeorz-Băi, in Bistrița-Năsăud County. The Someșul Mare River has its source in the Rodna Mountains and separates them from the Bârgău Mountains.

== Access ==
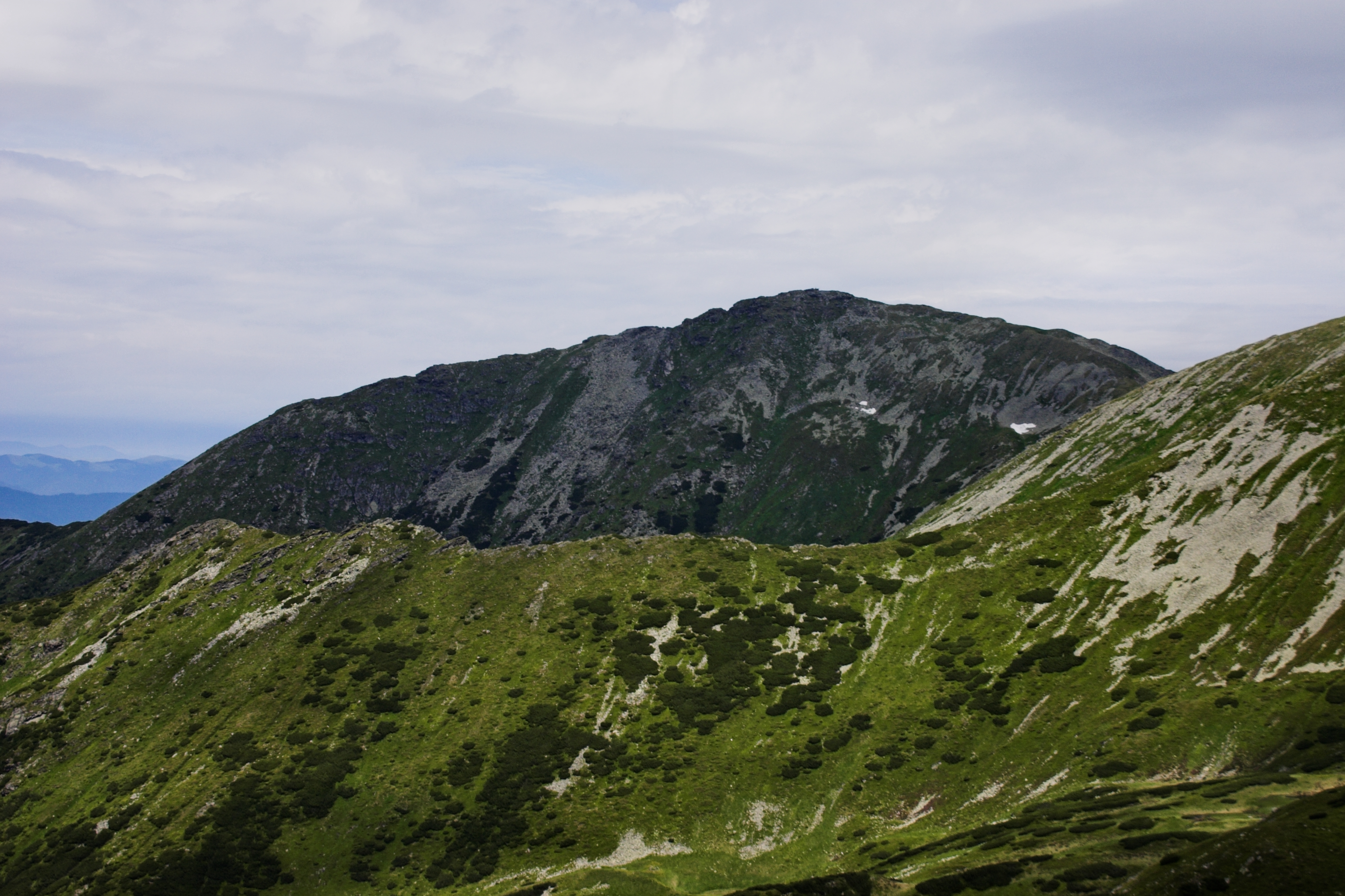
Pietrosul Rodnei Peak (2,303 m)

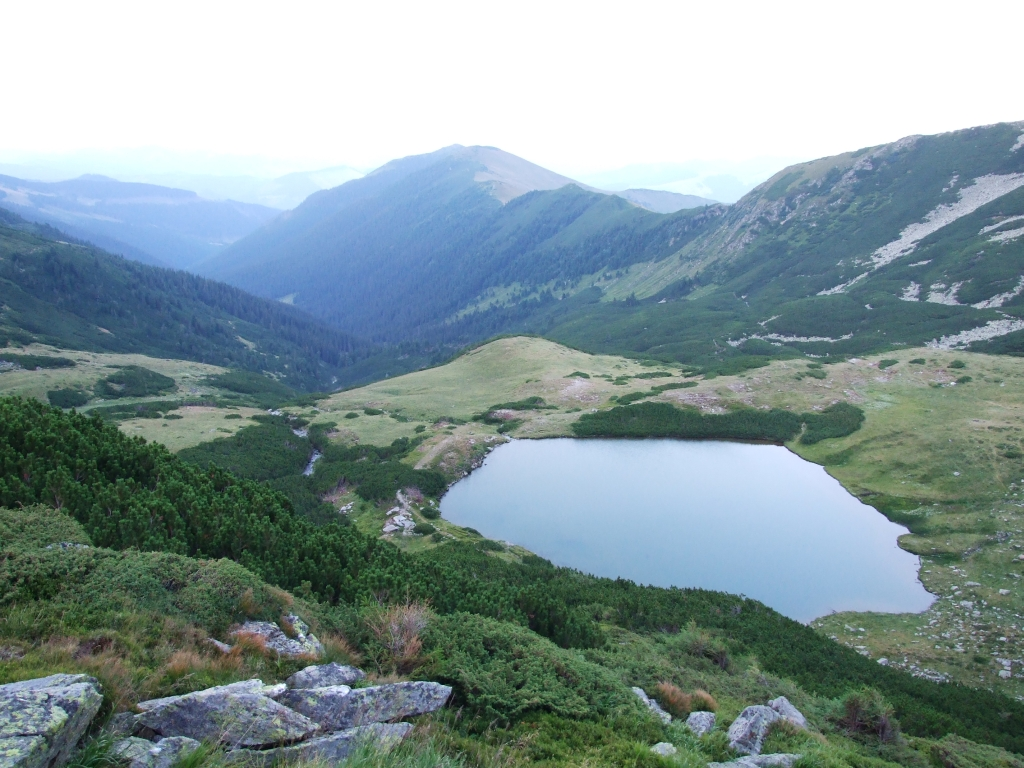
Lala Mare glacial lake

The most used access points to the mountain are:

- Șetref Pass, by car or train, from the Dealu Ștefăniței train station.
- Borșa city, by car or bus; from the center of the city, there is a path to the Iezer weather station and lake.
- Borșa ski resort, by car or bus; access is from the top of the ski slope, directly to the main ridge at "Șaua Gărgălău".
- Prislop Pass, by car; from the pass there is a marked path that meets the one from the top of the ski slope, also leading to "Șaua Gărgălău".
- Rodna Veche village, by train or car; from the village there are two marked paths leading to the main ridge, one of them going directly to the Ineu Peak.

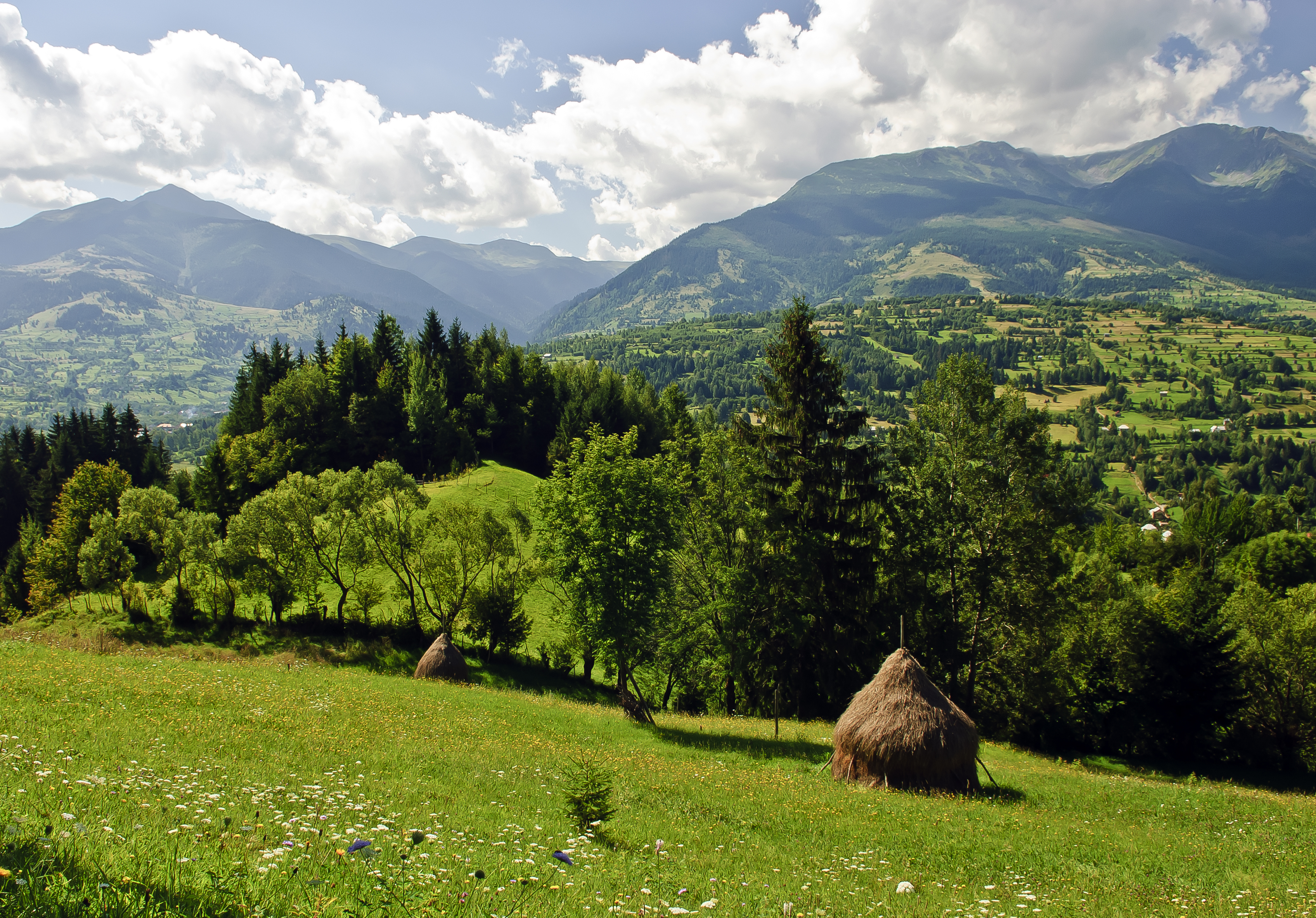
Pietrosu Mare

== Accommodation ==
There are a few resorts at the base of the mountain, notably Borșa ski resort, with a few hotels and many privately run guesthouses, and also the new "Valea Blaznei" resort, completed in 2007, near the village of Șanț. It contains two notable places to stay, "Cabana Vio" at 1,100 m (6 km from Șanț village), and a bit higher, "Cabana Diana" at 1,240 m, which is a mountain refuge. Up on the ridge there is no accommodation whatsoever, so tourists should bring tents.

== Nature reserve ==
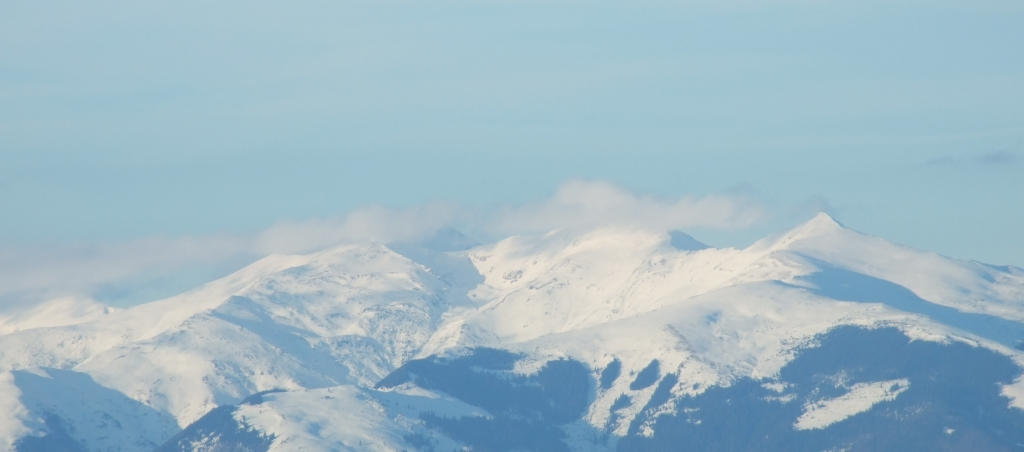
Ineu Peak (2,279 m)

The entire Rodna Mountain is included in the Rodna National Park and Biosphere Reserve. This is a 567 km^{2} (219 sq mi) reservation in the Eastern Carpathians with brown bears, lynx, gray wolves, black capercaillies, and eagles.
