= Rodna Mountains National Park =

National park in Romania

- Parcul Național Munții Rodnei
- IUCN category II (national park)
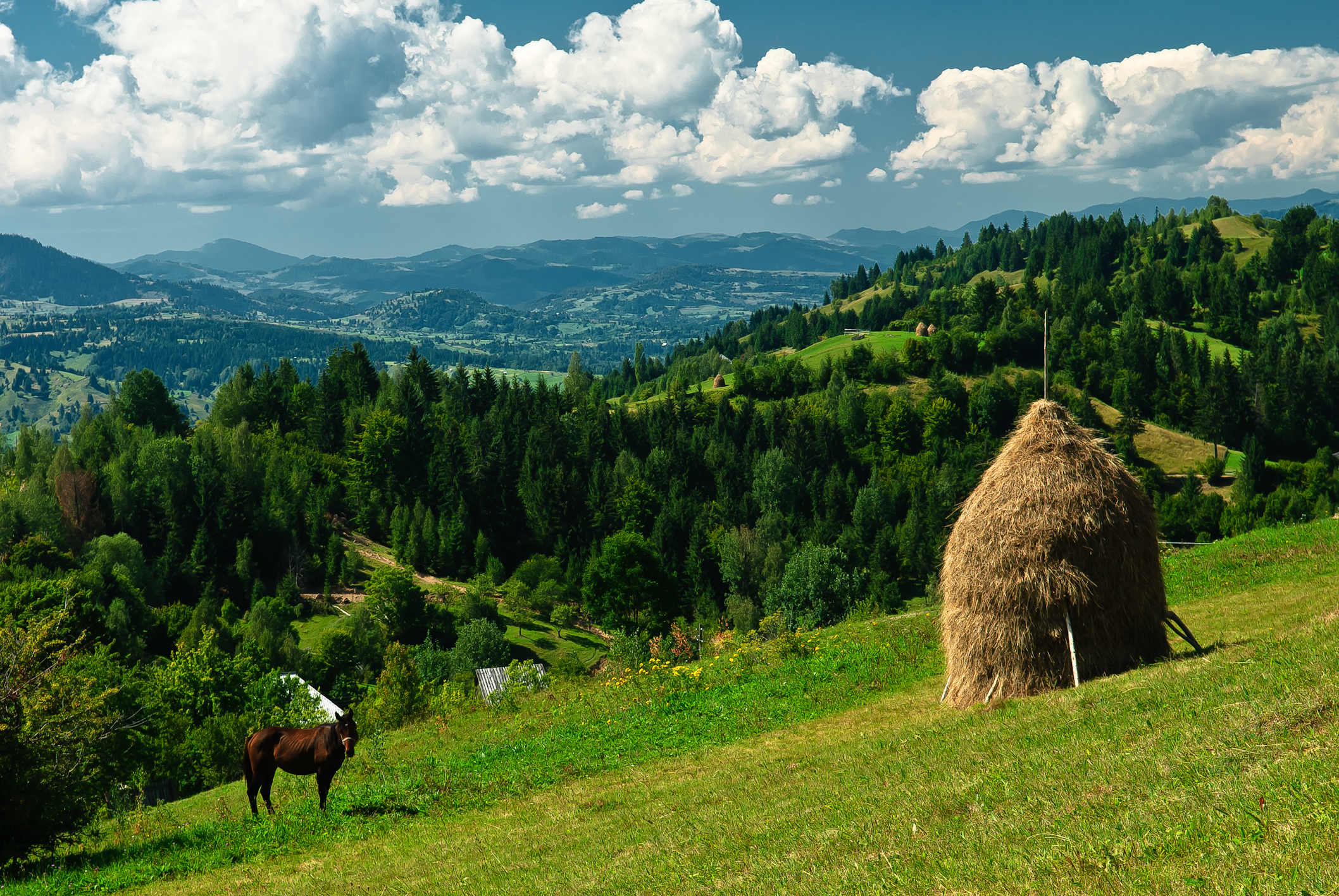

- Location within Romania
- Location: Romania; Bistrița-Năsăud County; Maramureș County; Suceava County
- Nearest city: Borșa
- Coordinates: 47°32′24″N 24°44′06″E
- Area: 46,599 hectares (115,150 acres)
- Established: 2000, designation in 1990
- Website: www.parcrodna.ro

The Rodna Mountains National Park (Romanian: Parcul Național Munții Rodnei) is a protected area (national park category II IUCN) situated in Romania, in the administrative territory of counties Bistrița-Năsăud, Maramureș, and Suceava.

== Location ==
The National Park is located in Northern Romania, in the Rodna Mountains, a subdivision of the Eastern Carpathians.

== Description ==
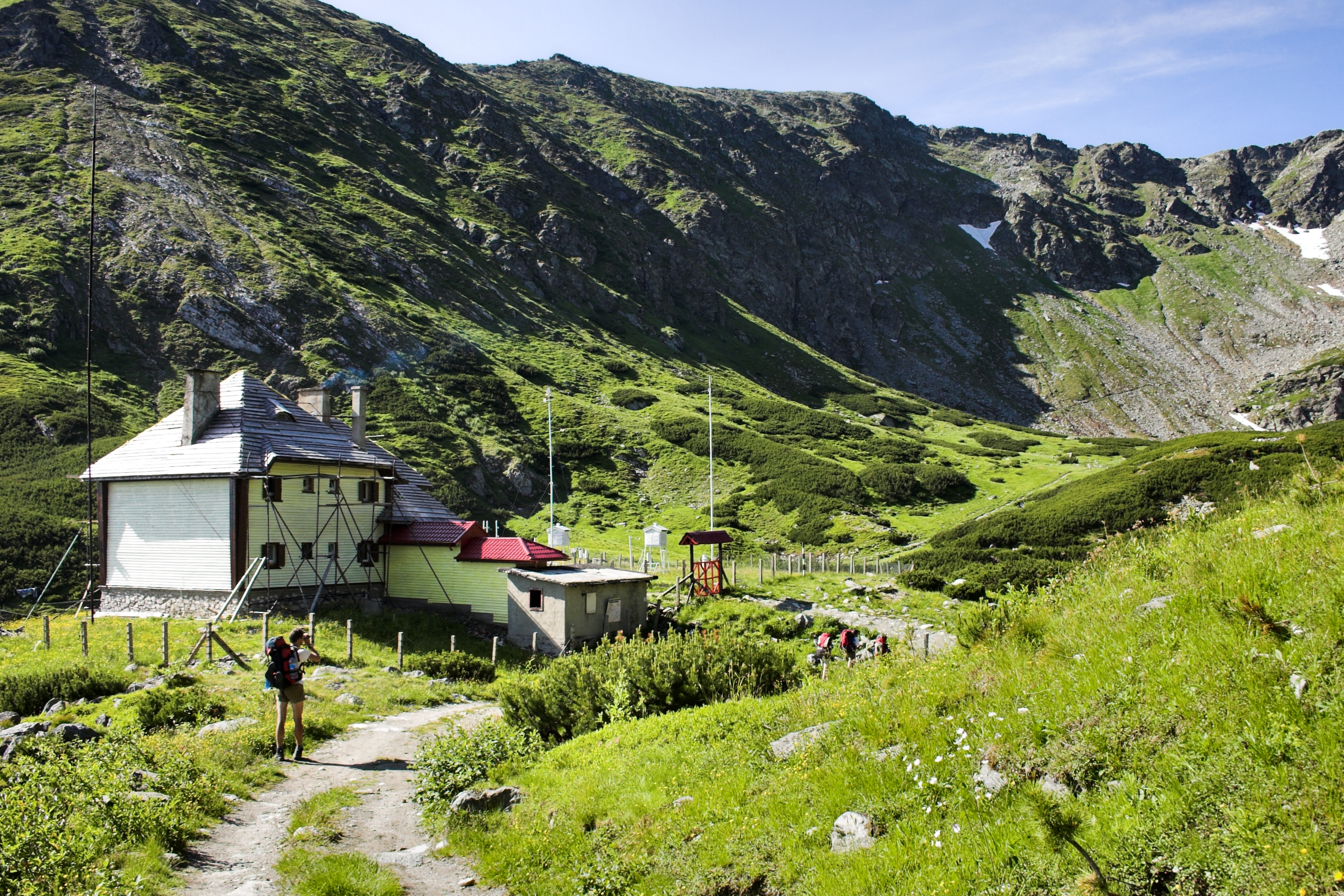
Meteorological station under the top of Pietrosul Rodnei Peak

The Rodna Mountains National Park with an area of 465.99 km^{2} (179.92 sq mi) was declared natural protected area by the Law Number 5 of March 6, 2000 (published in Monitorul Oficial Number 152 of April 12, 2000) and represents a mountainous area (ridges, mountain peaks, cirques, crevasses, caves, moraines, springs, valleys, forests, and pastures) that shelters a large variety of flora and fauna species, some protected by law.

Natural reserves included in the park:

- Bistrița-Năsăud County
  - Poiana cu narcise de pe Masivul Saca, 5 ha (12 acres)
  - Ineu-Lala, 2,568 ha (6,350 acres)
  - Izvoarele Mihăiesei, 50 ha (120 acres)
- Maramureș County
  - Izvorul Bătrâna, 0.5 ha (1.2 acres)
  - Pietrosu Mare, scientific reservation 3,300 ha (8,200 acres)
  - Piatra Rea, scientific reservation 409 ha (1,010 acres)
- Suceava County
  - Bila-Lala, 325.1 ha (803 acres)

== See also ==
- Maramureș Mountains Natural Park
- Protected areas of Romania
- Rodna Mountains
