= Budești, Maramureș =

Budești
- Commune
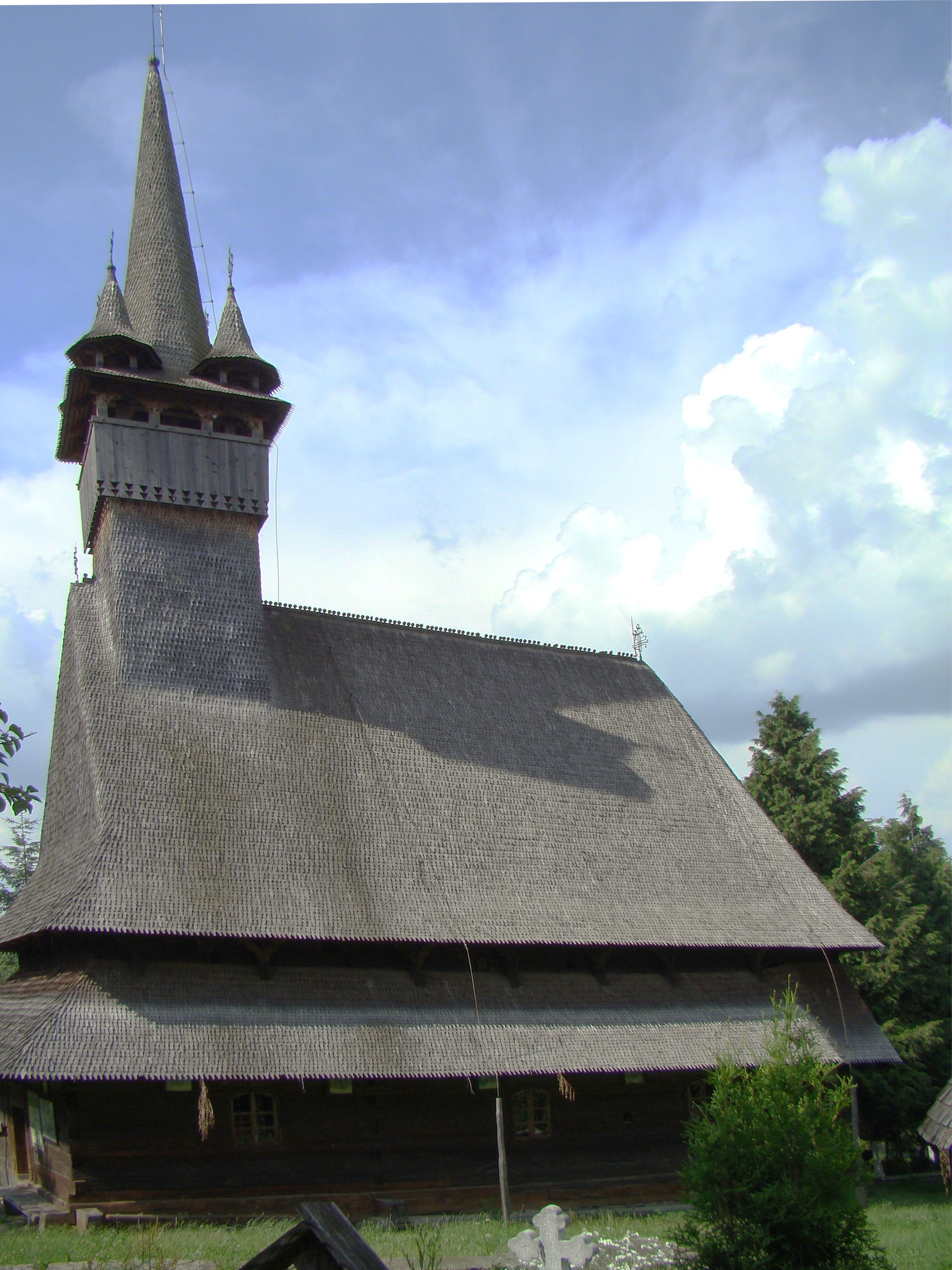
- Wooden church of Saint Nicholas in Budești Josani

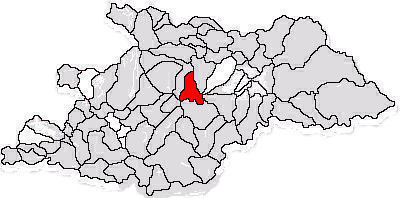
- Location in Maramureș County

- Location in Romania
- Coordinates: 47°43′50″N 23°56′40″E
- Country: Romania
- County: Maramureș
- Subdivisions: Budești, Sârbi

Government
  - Mayor (2020–2024): Simion Pop (PNL)
- Area: 84.51 km^{2} (32.63 sq mi)
- Elevation: 555 m (1,821 ft)
- Population (2021-12-01): 2,894
  - Density: 34.24/km^{2} (88.69/sq mi)
- Time zone: UTC+02:00 (EET)
  - Summer (DST): UTC+03:00 (EEST)
- Postal code: 437070
- Area code: +40 x59
- Vehicle reg.: MM
- Website: www.comuna-budesti.ro

Budești (Hungarian: Budfalva or Budfalu, Yiddish: בודשט, romanized: Budesht or Budest) is a commune in Maramureș County, Maramureș, Romania. It is composed of two villages, Budești and Sârbi (Hungarian: Szerfalva or Szerfalu, Yiddish: סערב, romanized: Sarb or Serb).

== Geography ==
The commune is located in the central part of Maramureș County, 44 km (27 mi) northeast of the county seat, Baia Mare, and lies on the banks of the river Cosău. County road DJ109F connects Budești with the town of Cavnic, 17 km (11 mi) away, through the Neteda Pass. The road features a gravity hill, where the layout of the surrounding land produces an optical illusion, making the 8% downhill slope appear to be an uphill slope.

== Churches ==
The 17th-century wooden church of Saint Nicholas, Budești Josani is one of eight Wooden Churches of Maramureș that UNESCO has listed as a World Heritage Site.

== Demographics ==
Historical population
Year	Pop.	±%
1880	2,570	—
1900	3,446	+34.1%
1910	3,677	+6.7%
1930	3,713	+1.0%
1956	3,681	−0.9%
1977	4,040	+9.8%
1992	3,988	−1.3%
2002	3,470	−13.0%
2011	3,055	−12.0%
2021	2,894	−5.3%
Source: Census data

At the 2021 census, the commune had a population of 2,894, of which 97.1% were ethnic Romanians.

== Natives ==
- Tit Bud (1846–1917), Romanian Greek Catholic priest and author
