= Saint Parascheva Church, Desești =

Saint Parascheva Church
- Biserica de lemn din Desești
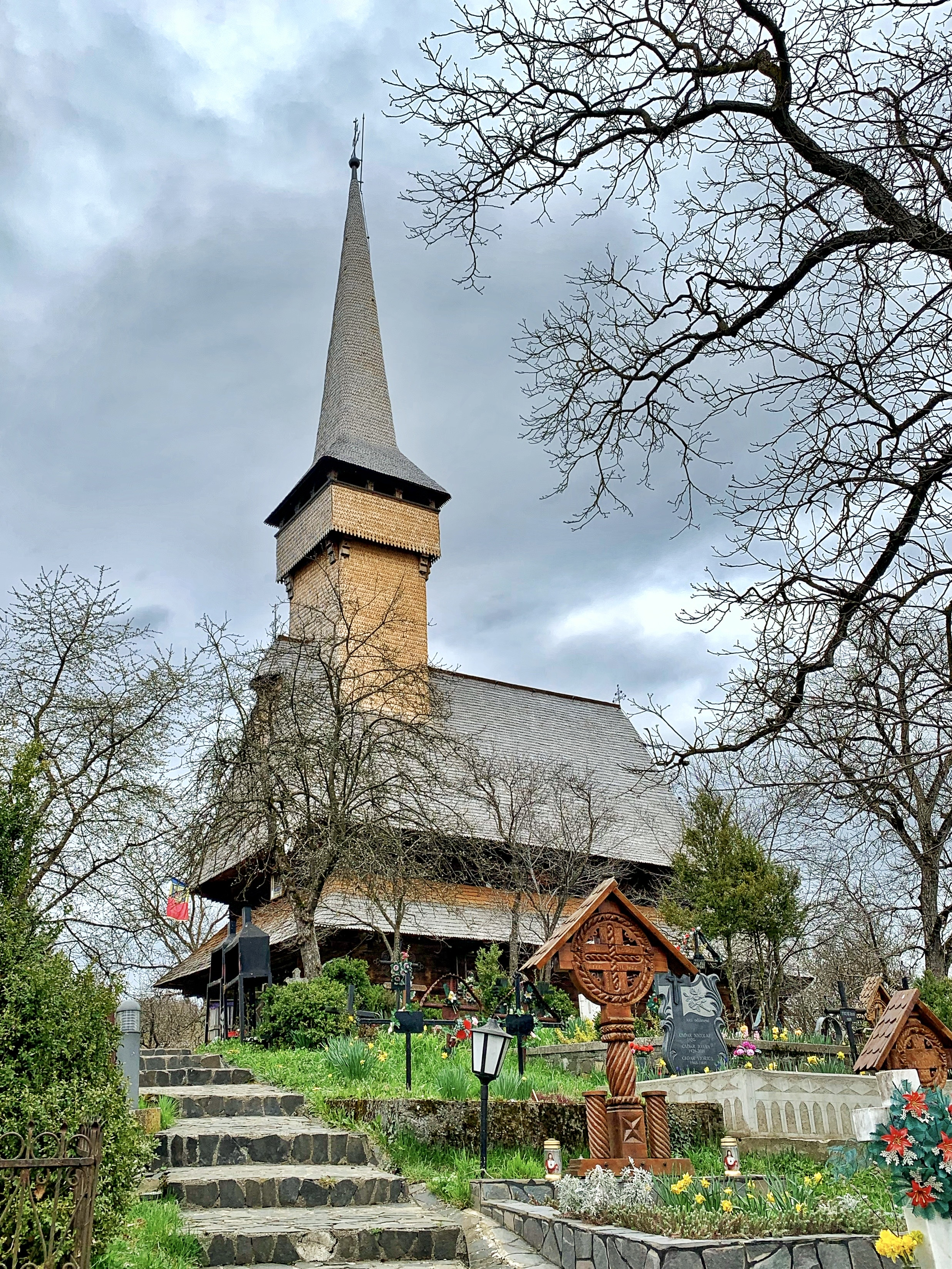
- The church in 2023
- Saint Parascheva Church
- Address: Desești, Maramureș County
- Country: Romania
- Denomination: Eastern Orthodox

History
- Status: active church

Administration
- Diocese: Diocese of Maramureș and Sătmar

UNESCO World Heritage Site
- Part of: Wooden Churches of Maramureş
- Criteria: Cultural: (iv)
- Reference: 904
- Inscription: 1999 (23rd Session)

Saint Parascheva Church is a Romanian Orthodox church in Desești Commune, Maramureș County, Romania. Built in 1770, it is one of eight buildings that make up the wooden churches of Maramureș UNESCO World Heritage Site, and is also listed as a historic monument by the country's Ministry of Culture and Religious Affairs.

== Gallery ==
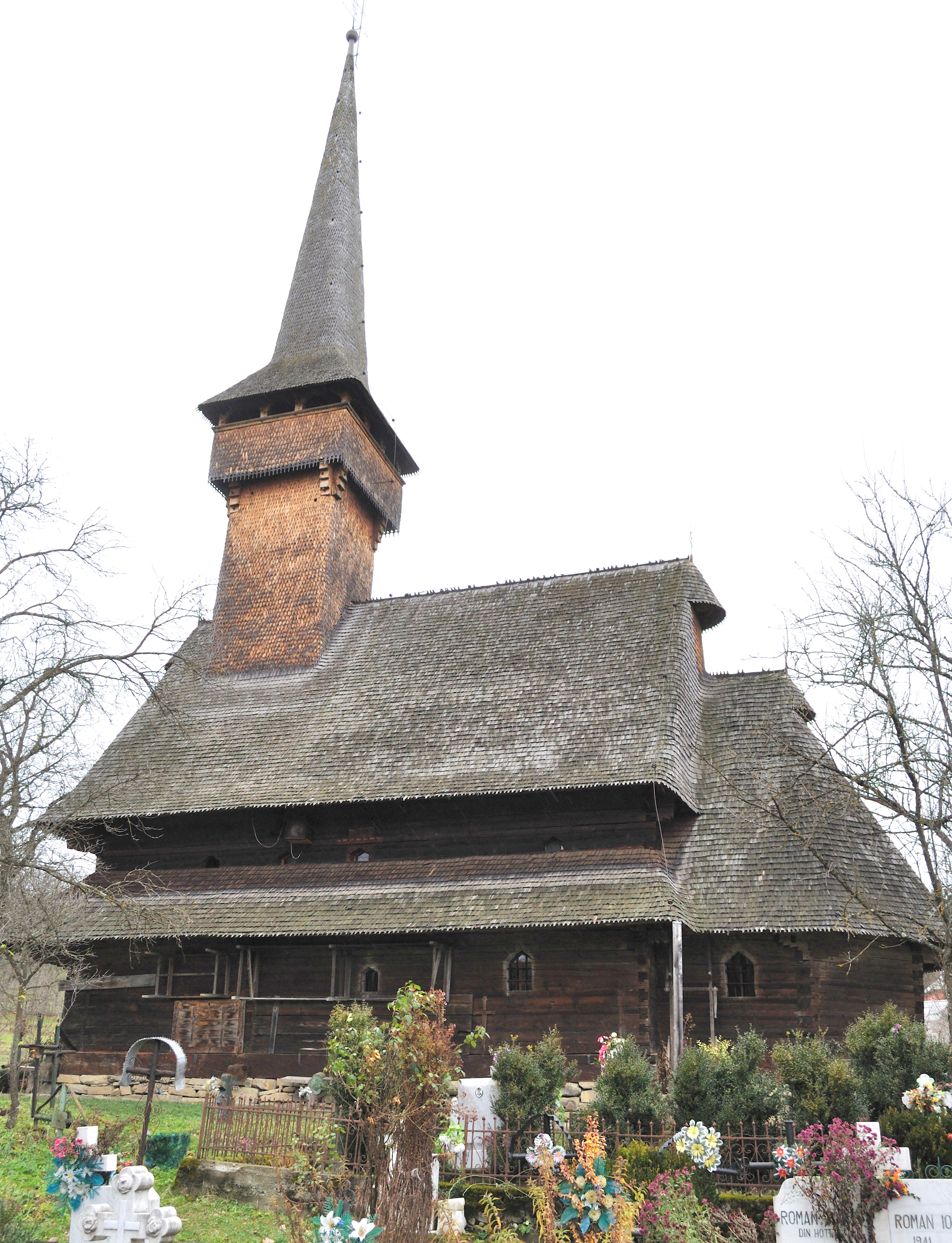
Side view

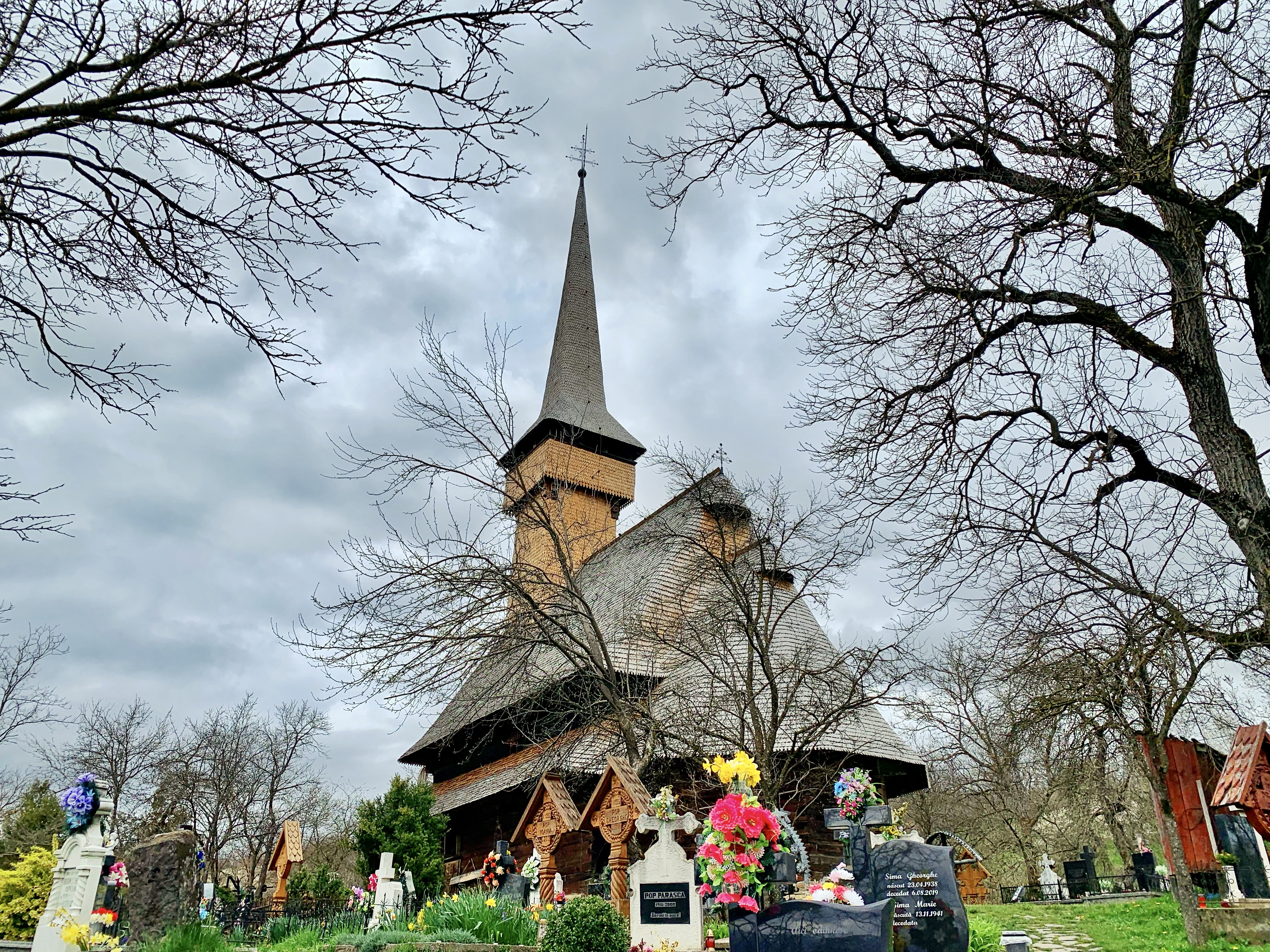
Church as approached from the entry

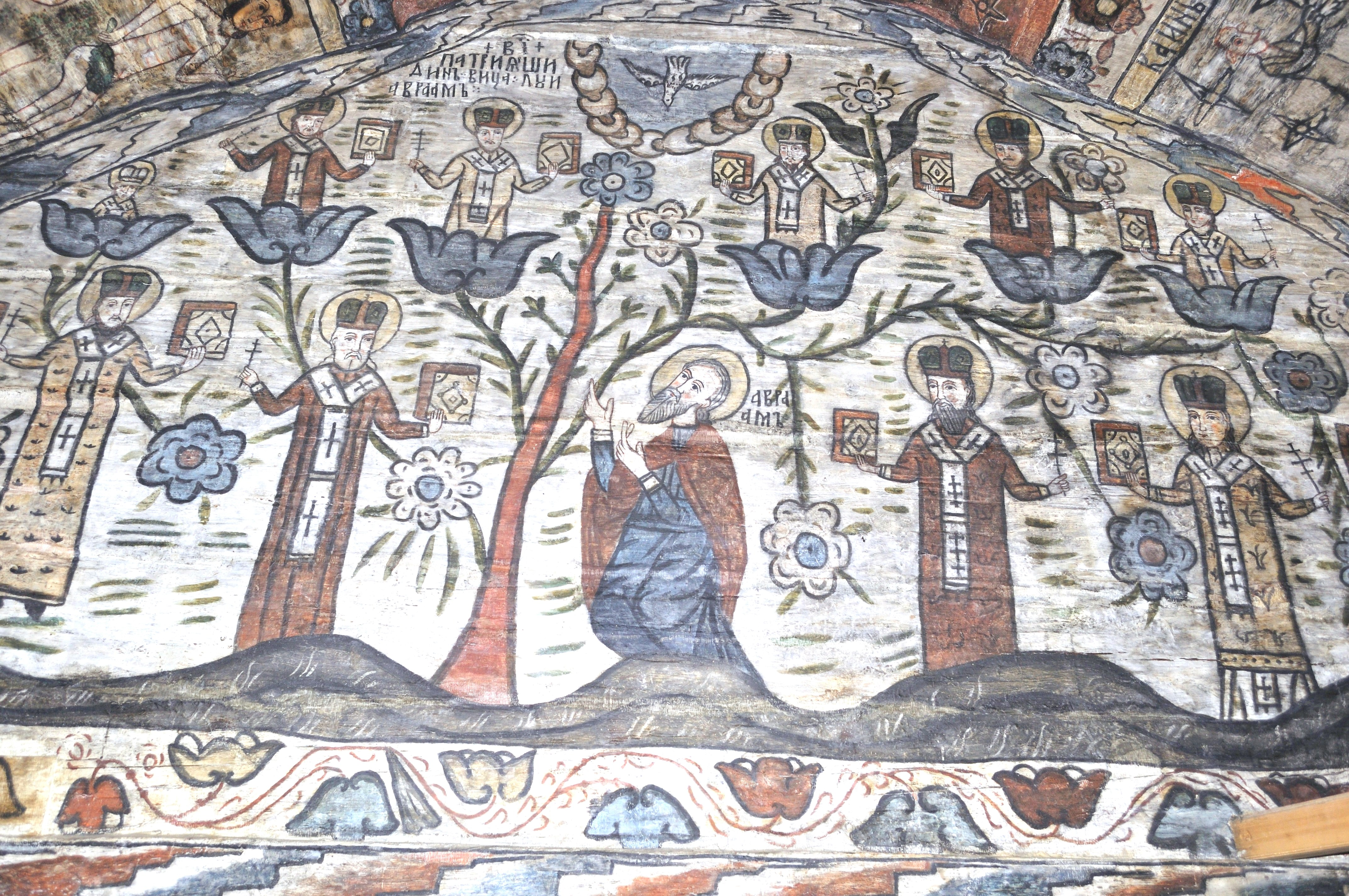
West tympanum of the nave: Tree of the Patriarchs

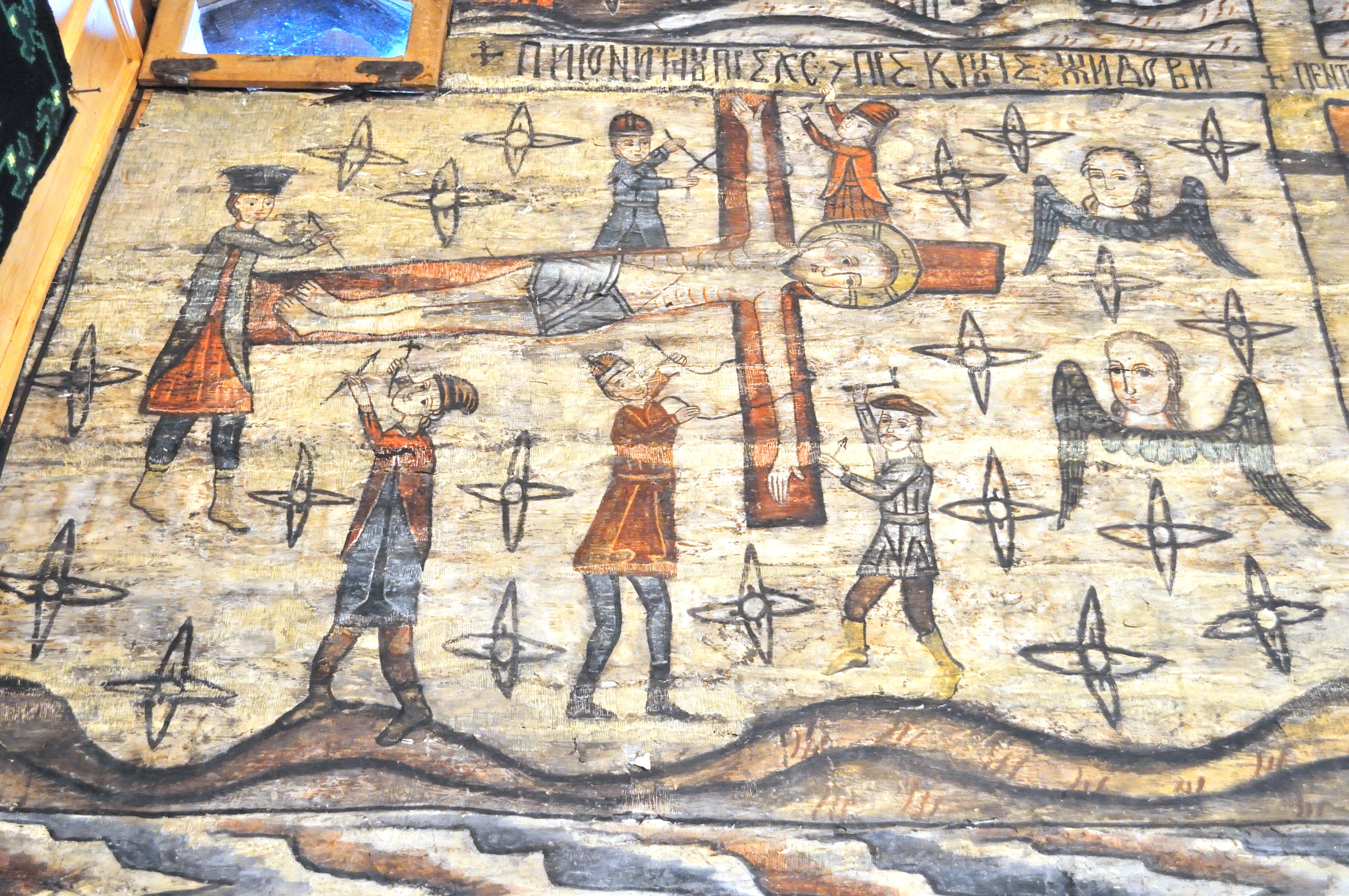
Crucifixion scene

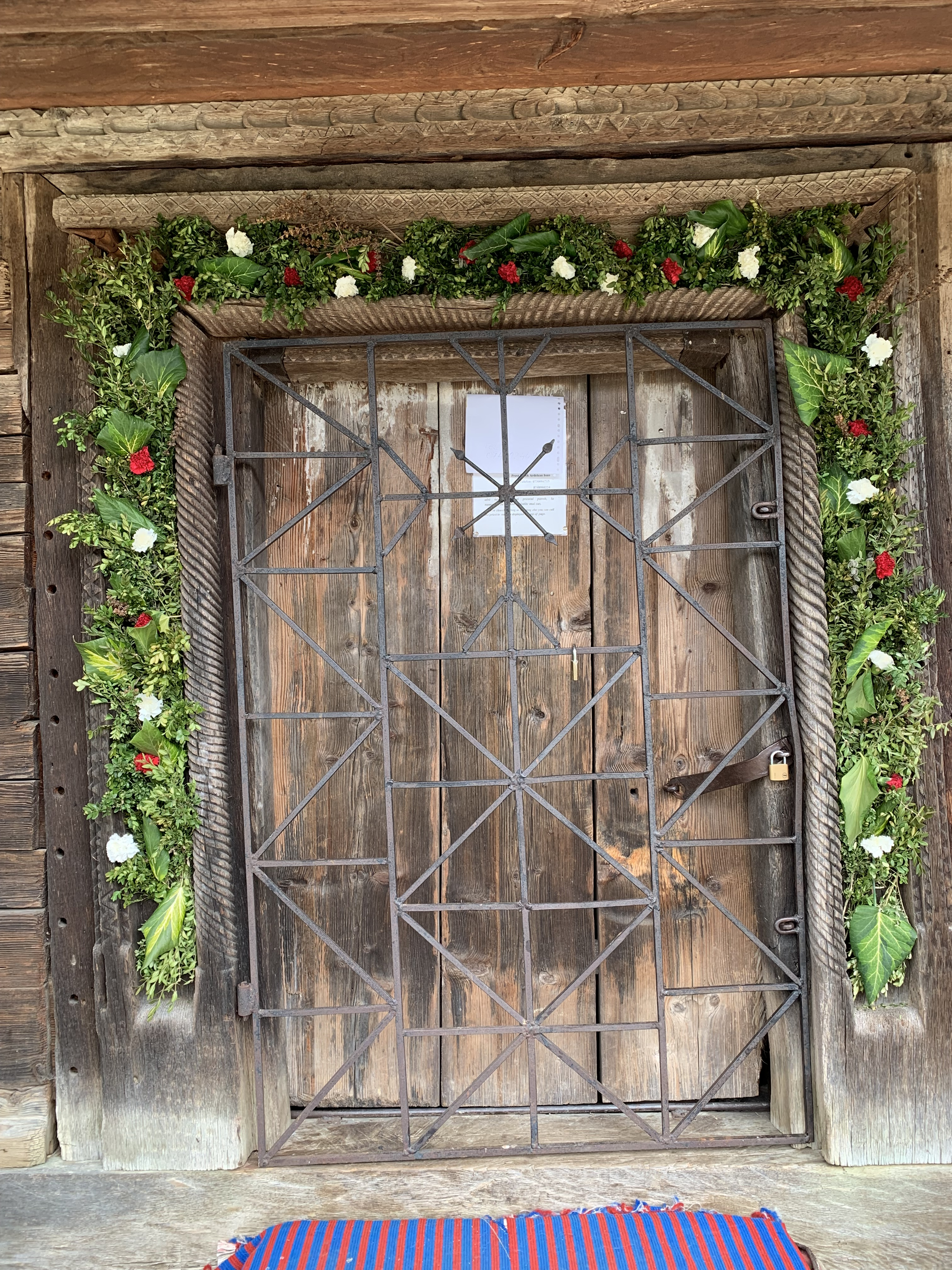
Entry portal

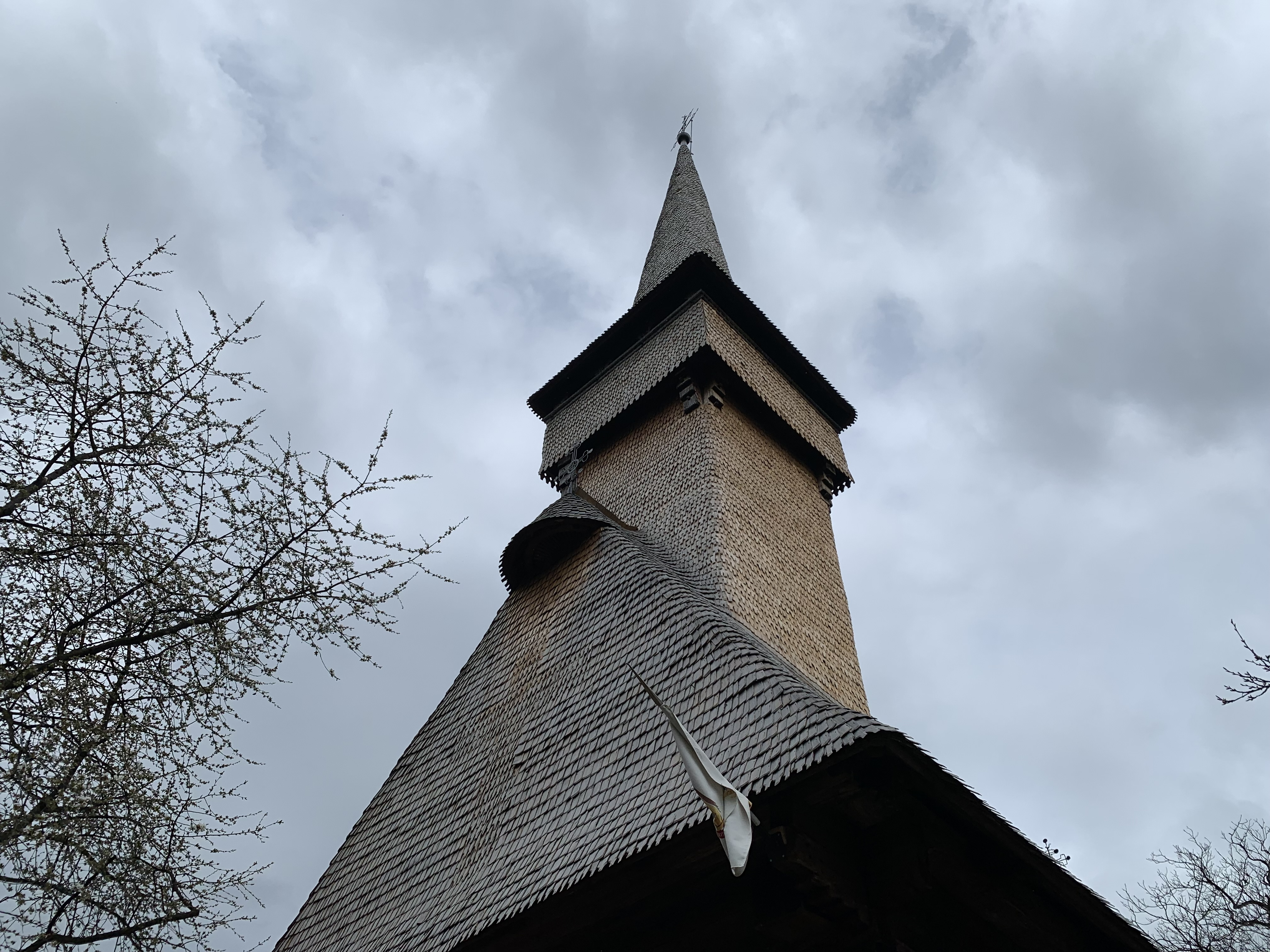
Roof details

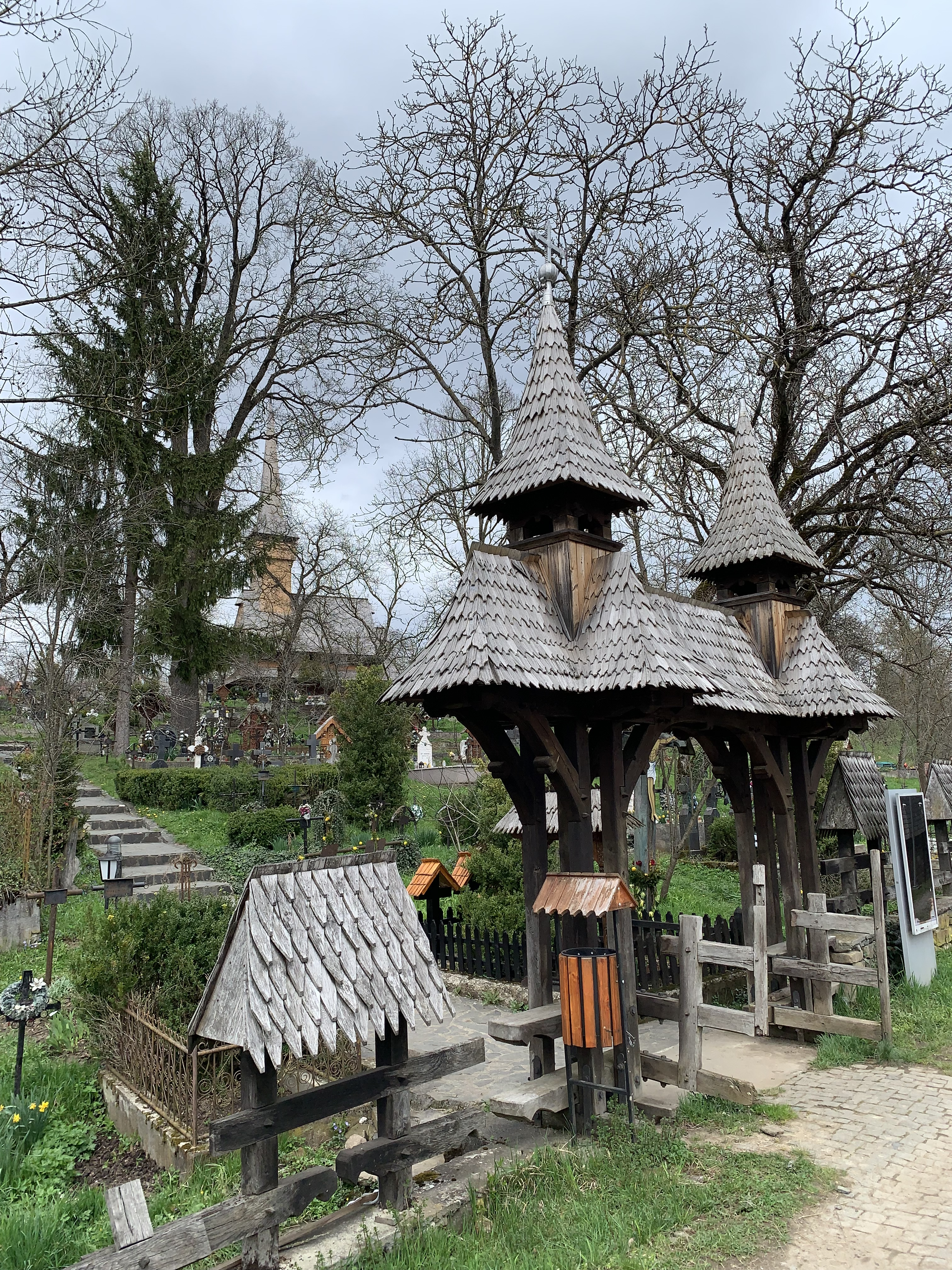
Gateway to the church

== Bibliography ==
- Porumb, Marius (1982), "Biserici de lemn din Țara Maramureșului", Monumente istorice de artă religioasă din Arhiepiscopia Vadului, Feleacului și Clujului (in Romanian), Cluj-Napoca
- Porumb, Marius (2005). Biserici de lemn din Maramureș (in Romanian). Bucharest: Editura Academiei Române. ISBN 9789732712573. OCLC 263742545.
