= Wooden churches of Maramureș =

UNESCO World Heritage Site
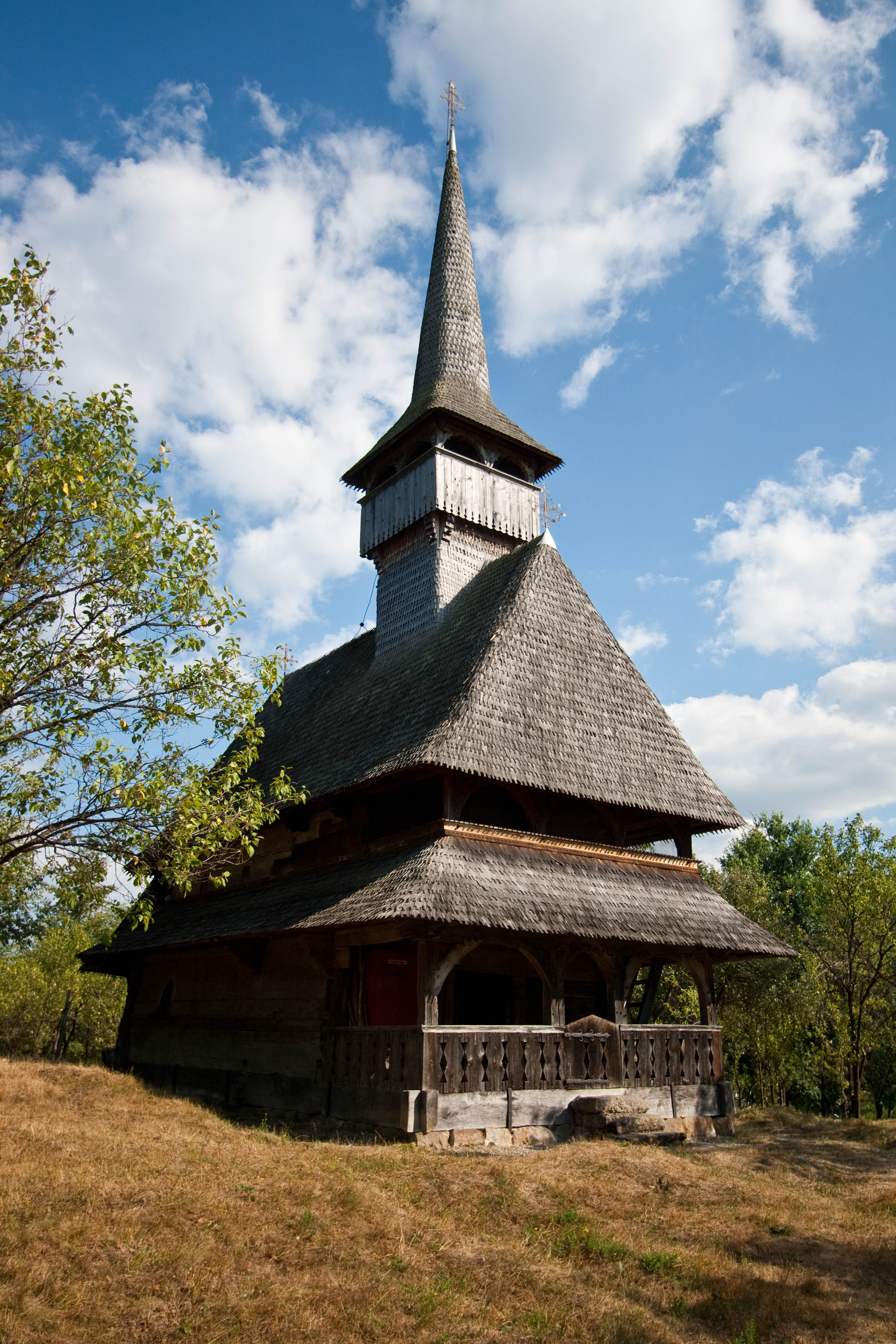
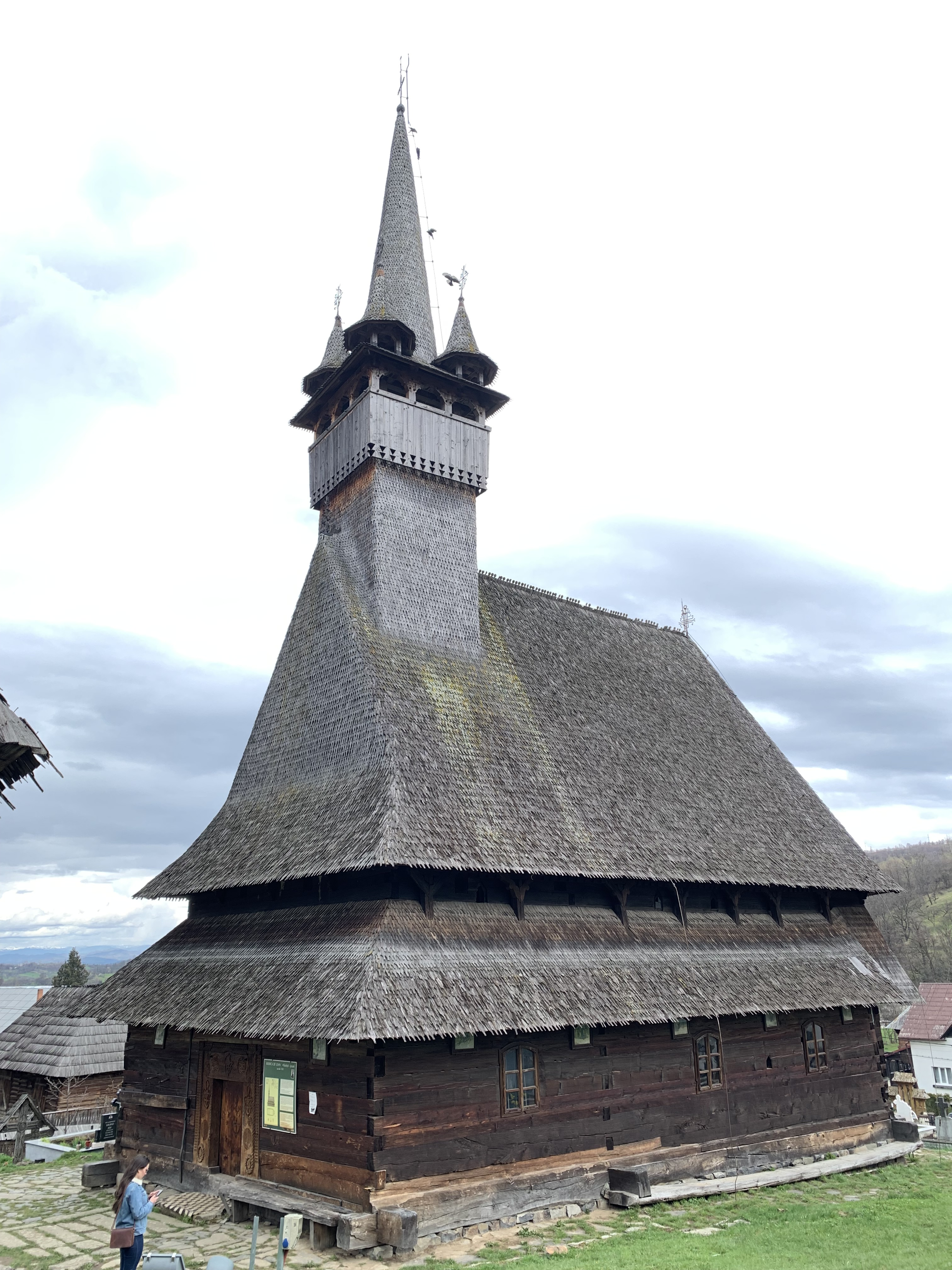
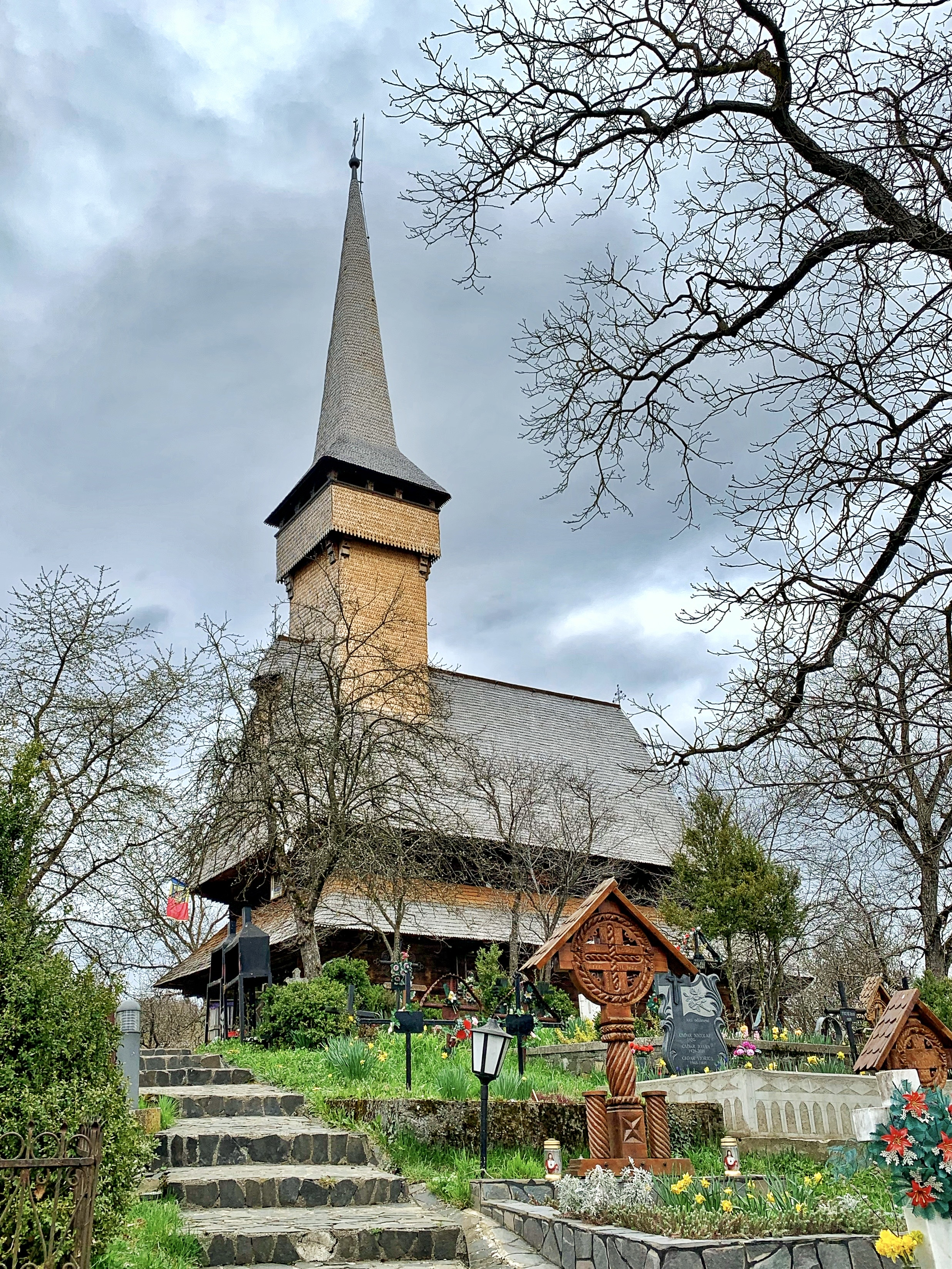
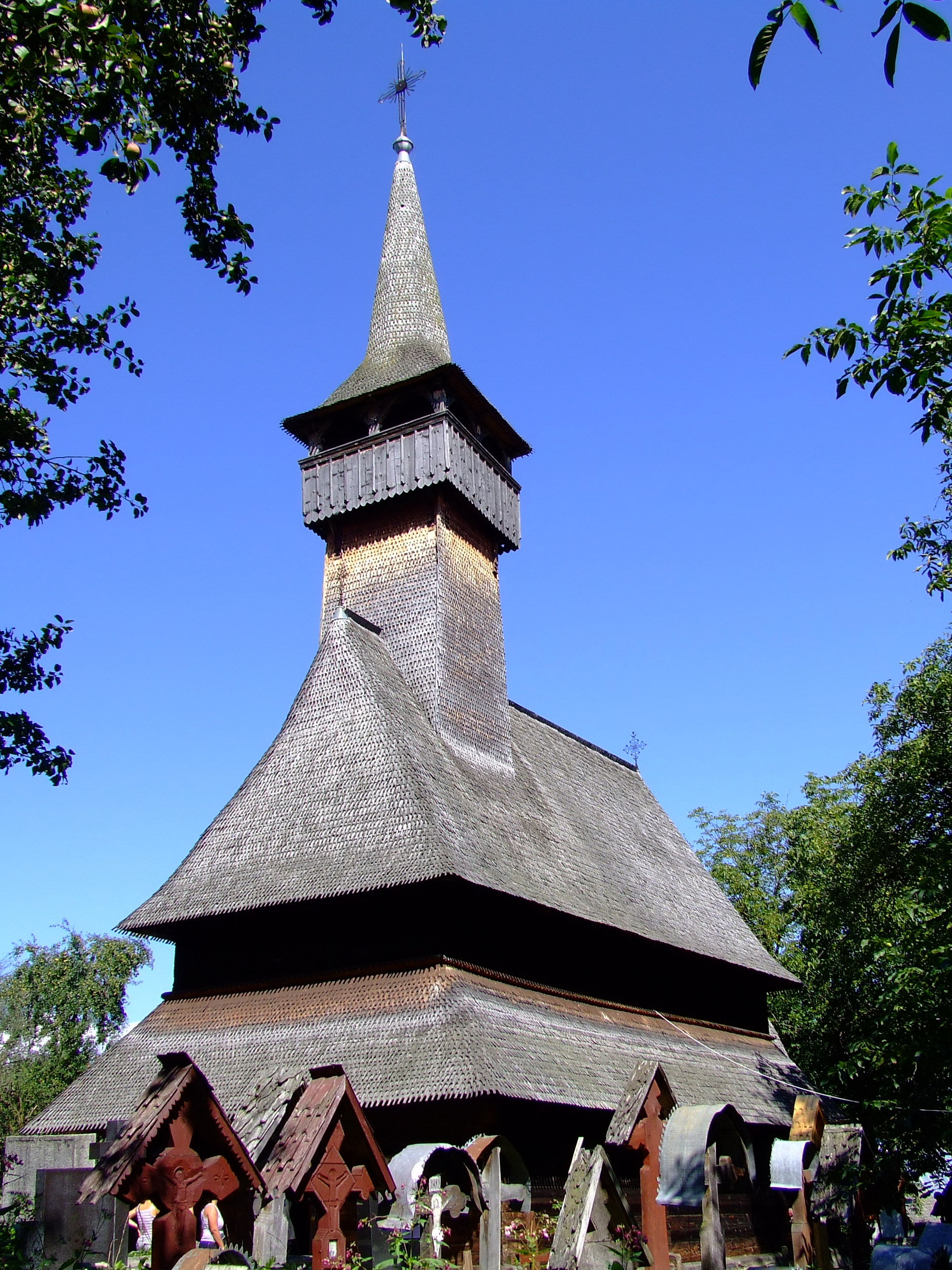
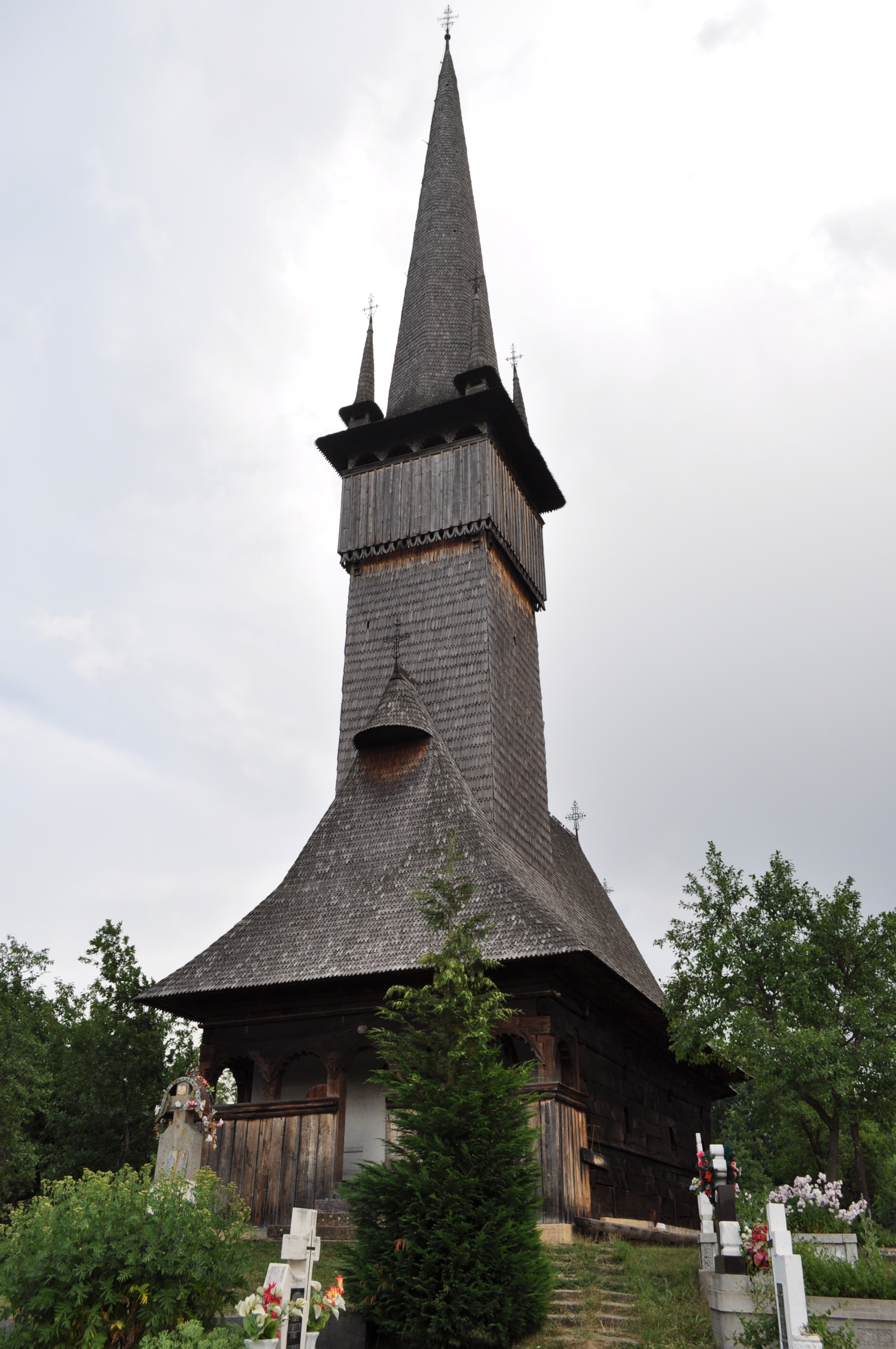
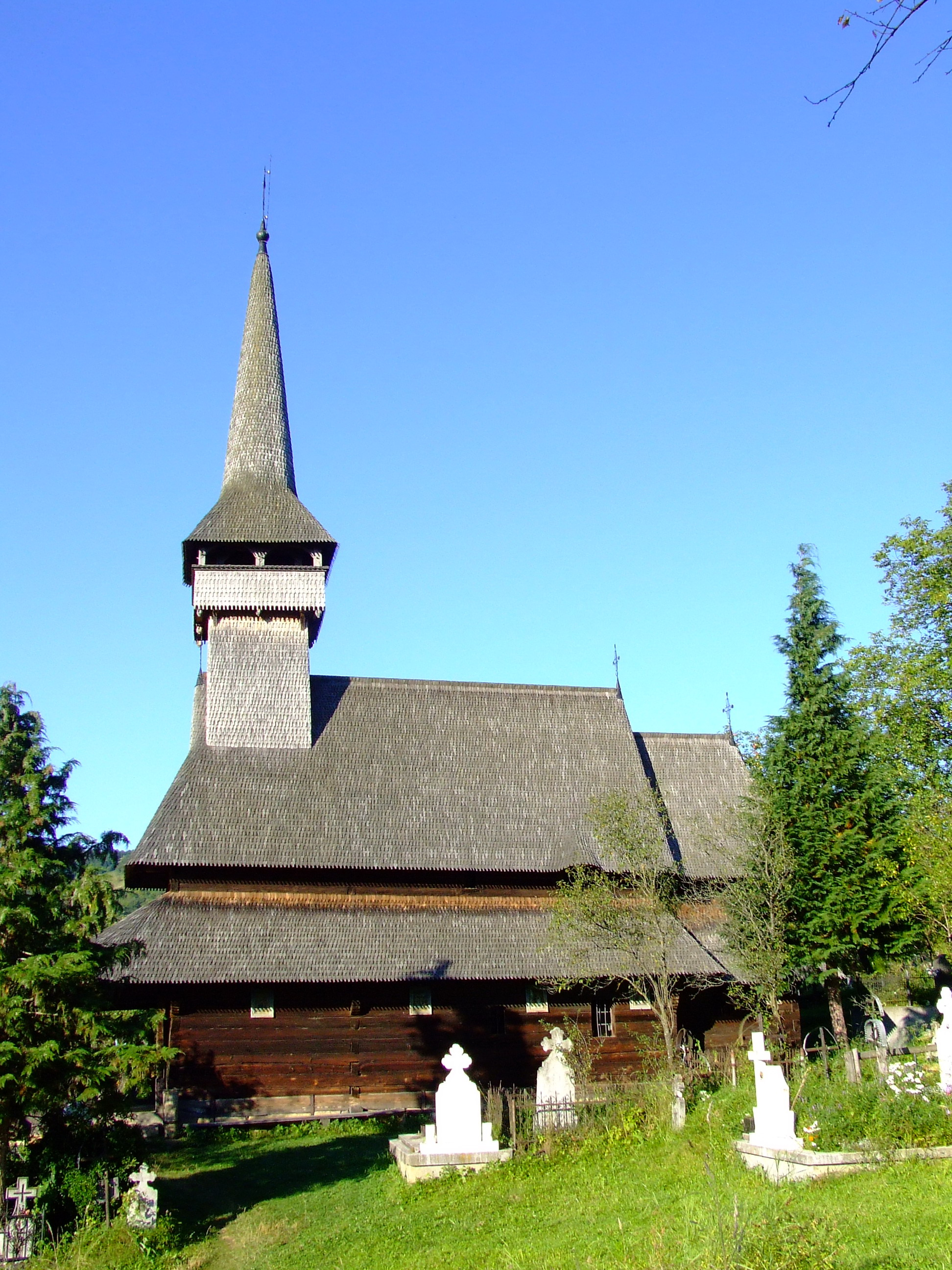
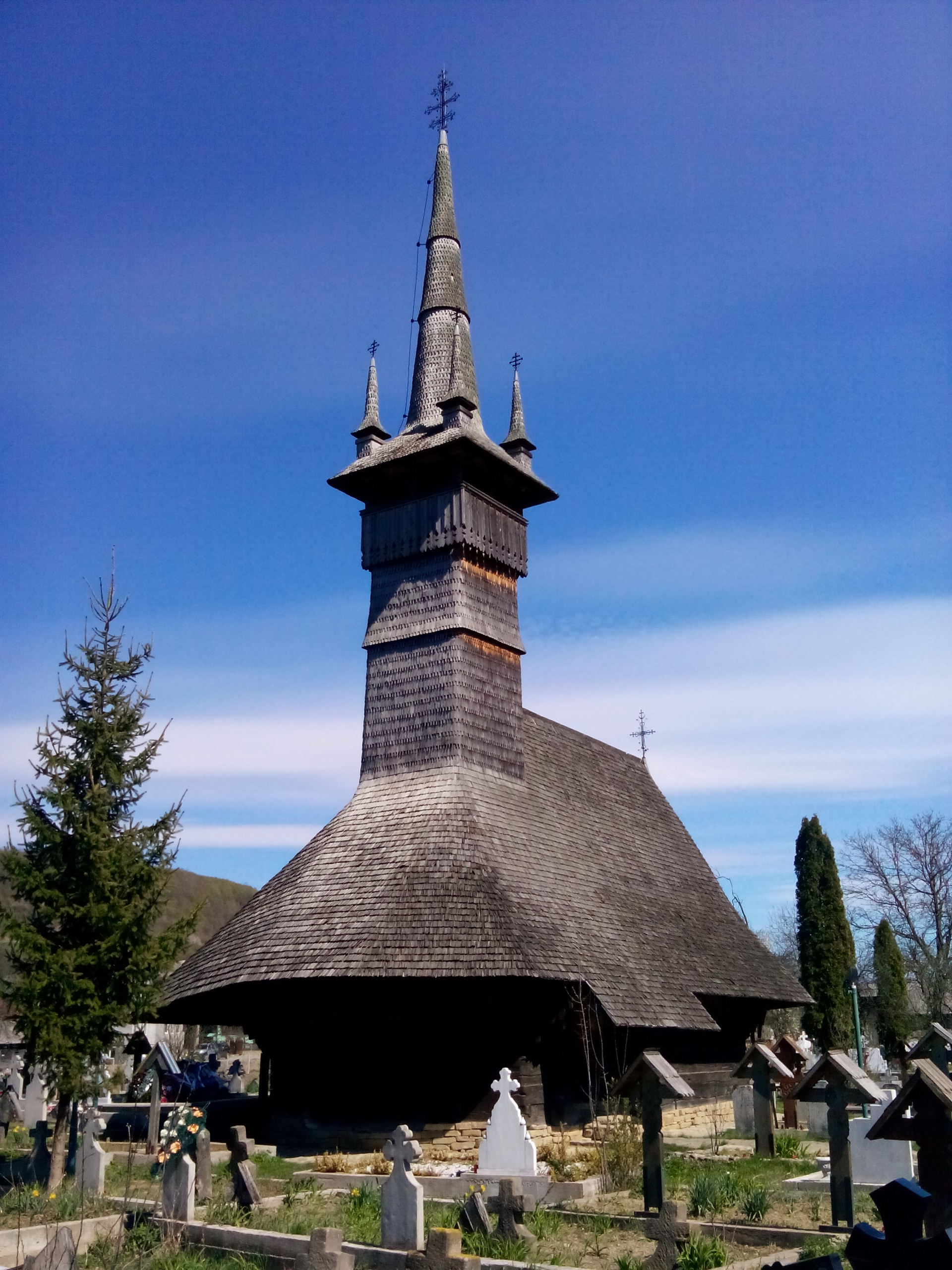
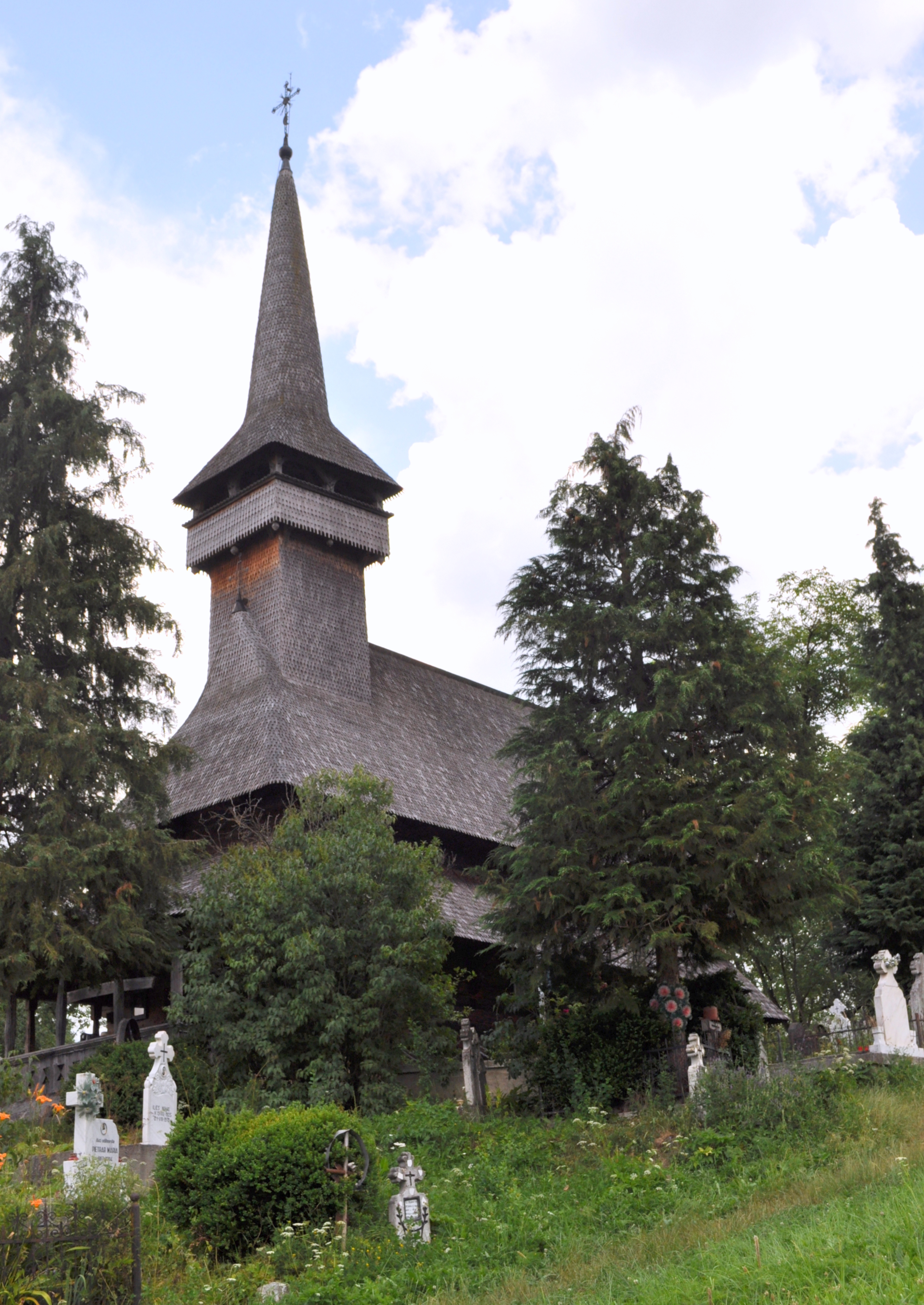
- The eight sites inscribed are: (left to right, and top to bottom) Bârsana, Budești Josani, Desești, Ieud Hill, Plopiș, Poienile Izei, Rogoz, Șurdești
- Interactive map of Wooden churches of Maramureș
- Location: Maramureș County, Romania
- Criteria: Cultural: iv
- Reference: 904
- Inscription: 1999 (23rd Session)
- Wooden churches sites: 1 = Bârsana, 2 = Budești, 3 = Desești, 4 = Ieud, 5 = Plopiș, 6 = Poienile Izei, 7 = Rogoz, 8 = Șurdești

The wooden churches of Maramureș in the Maramureș region of northern Transylvania are a group of almost one hundred Orthodox churches, and occasionally Greek-Catholic ones, of different architectural solutions from different periods and areas. The Maramureș churches are high timber constructions with characteristic tall, slim bell towers at the western end of the building. They are a particular vernacular expression of the cultural landscape of this mountainous area of northern Romania.

Maramureș is one of the better-known regions of Romania, with autonomous traditions since the Middle Ages. Its well-preserved wooden villages and churches, its traditional lifestyle, and the local colourful dresses still in use make Maramureș as near to a living museum as can be found in Europe.

The wooden churches of the region that still stand were built starting from the 17th century all the way to 19th century. Some were erected on the place of older churches. They were a response to the prohibition against the erection of stone Orthodox churches by the Catholic Austro-Hungarian authorities. The churches are made of thick logs, some are quite small and dark inside but several of them have impressive measures. They are painted with rather "naïve" Biblical scenes, mostly by local painters. The most characteristic features are the tall tower above the entrance and the massive roof that seems to dwarf the main body of the church.

Eight were listed by the UNESCO as World Heritage Sites in 1999, for their religious architecture and timber construction traditions. These are: Bârsana, Budești, Desești, Ieud, Plopiș, Poienile Izei, Rogoz, Șurdești.

== Description ==
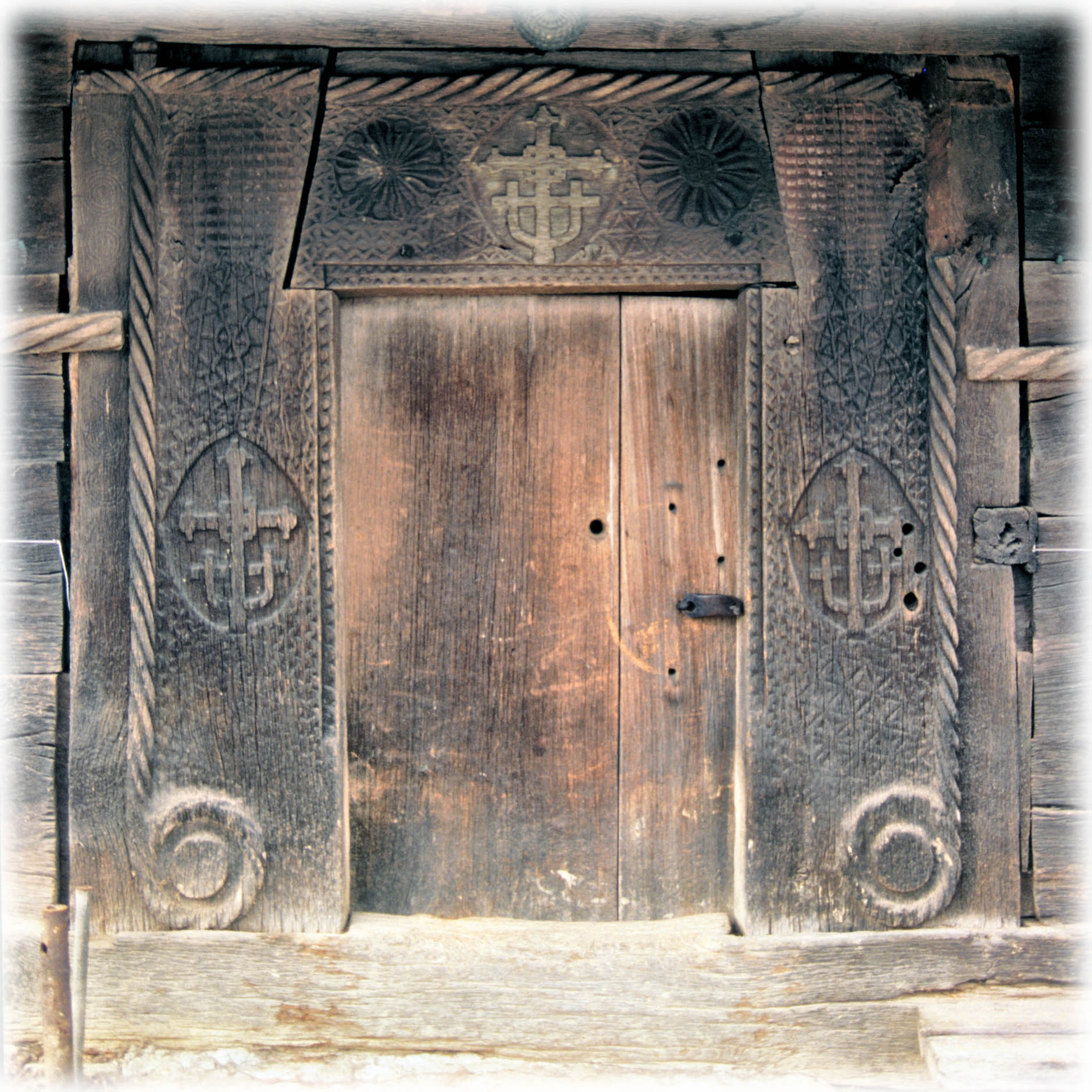
The portal from Sârbi Susani church (1639)

The historical Romanian region of Maramureș, partitioned between Romania and Sub-Carpathian Ruthenia after World War I, is one of the places where traditional log building was not interrupted and where a rich heritage in wood survives. The tradition of building wooden churches in central and southern Maramureș can be traced from the beginning of the 16th century to the turn of the 18th century. Since the knowledge used to build the local wooden churches circulated throughout Europe, their understanding is of high interest far outside the region.

In Maramureș today almost 100 wooden churches still stand, about one third of their total two centuries ago. Besides the extant wooden churches, a major source of knowledge is still saved by a number of practicing senior carpenters with relevant knowledge and skills in traditional carpentry.

From the Middle Ages until the turn of the 18th century the skills, knowledge and experience to build ample log structures with plane and well sealed walls, as well as with flush joints, were performances out of the ordinary. The craftsmen from Maramureș who were able to reach such levels were not simple peasants but well specialised church carpenters who inherited and maintained this advanced knowledge to exclusively build houses of worship.

Since the local tradition to erect wooden churches depended on those who built and used them, it is fundamental to identify the local builders and founders. The earlier blurred distinction between them veiled their separate roles in shaping the wooden churches and hindered us from a clear understanding of the results.

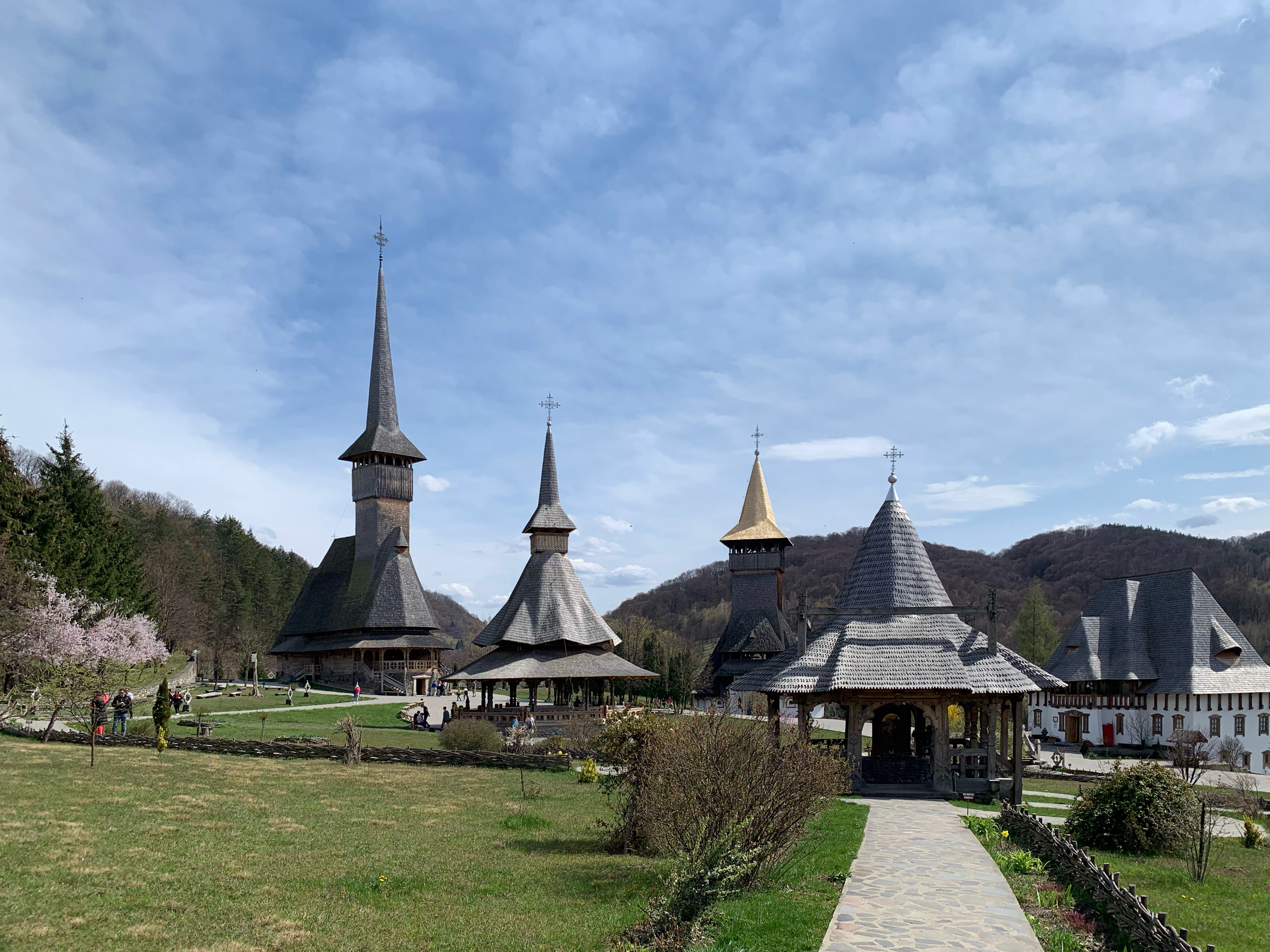
Bârsana Monastery Complex

The extant wooden churches from Maramureș reveal the existence during the 17th and 18th centuries of at least two main family schools of church carpenters. There are further distinguishable three main itineraries and numerous smaller ones, indicating the work of some of the most important church carpenters ever active in the region and in some cases even shifts among generations. In general, the church carpenters stood for the technical performances, the high quality of the wood work and the artistic refinement.

In a long perspective, the true creators of the local wooden churches were actually the commissioning founders. Especially the role of the noble founders of Eastern Christian rite was decisive in the formation of a regional character among the local wooden churches. The wooden churches from Maramureș closely mirror the local society of modest country landlords, manifesting themselves along several centuries in their double condition of Eastern Christians and Western nobles.

The wooden churches from Maramureș open necessary connections with similar performances throughout Europe. Seemingly the local distinction made between sacred and profane rooms was characteristic for many other rural regions on the continent. The highest knowledge in log building seems to have had a sacred purpose with wide continental circulation and therefore in many places requires distinction from the more regionally rooted vernacular one.

The publication in a journal from 1866 of several drawings representing a wooden church from Seini, situated in the neighbouring Szatmár County, produced echoes in Europe, being compared with the already famous Norwegian stave churches.

With the resurgence of church construction after the Romanian Revolution of 1989, there are new churches built in the traditional style.

== Wooden churches ==
The list shows extant wooden churches in bold and also includes some known vanished ones. For those now in Ukraine, Romanian and Hungarian names of Ukrainian villages are given in (parentheses). In Romanian, Susani denotes "high-dwellers" and Josani "lower-dwellers". Thus the names distinguish the churches of those large villages which had more than one.

- Cavnic valley
  - **Șurdești** (**UNESCO**)
- Cosău valley
  - **Budești Susani**
  - **Budești Josani** (**UNESCO**)
  - **Călinești Căeni**
  - **Călinești Susani**
  - **Cornești**
  - **Ferești**
  - **Sârbi Susani**
  - **Sârbi Josani**
- Iza valley
  - **Bârsana** (**UNESCO**)
  - **Botiza**
  - Botiza old
  - **Cuhea** (Bogdan Vodă at present)
  - **Dragomirești**
  - **Glod**
  - **Ieud Deal** (**UNESCO**)
  - **Ieud Șes**
  - Nănești
  - **Oncești**
  - **Poienile Izei** (**UNESCO**)
  - **Rozavlea**
  - **Săliștea de Sus, Nistorești**
  - **Săliștea de Sus, Buleni**
  - **Șieu**
  - Slătioara
  - **Strâmtura**
  - **Valea Stejarului**
- Lăpuș valley
  - **Rogoz** (**UNESCO**)
- Mara valley
  - Berbești
  - **Breb**
  - **Desești** (**UNESCO**)
  - **Hărnicești**
  - **Hoteni**
  - **Mănăstirea**
  - **Sat Șugătag**
- Valea Morii valley
  - **Șurdești** (**UNESCO**)
- Vișeu valley
  - **Borșa din Jos**
  - Crăciunești
  - Moisei Josani
  - **Mănăstirea Moisei**
  - Moisei Susani
  - **Poienile de sub Munte**
  - Repedea
  - **Rona de Jos**
  - **Săpânța-Peri Monastery**
  - Văleni
- Ukrainian side
  - Apșița (Ukrainian: Vodytsia, Hungarian: Felso-Apsa-Apsicza)
  - **Apșa de Mijloc, Susani** (Ukrainian: Serednie Vodiane, Hungarian: Kozep Apsa)
  - **Apșa de Mijloc, Josani**
  - **Apșa din Jos, Părău** (Ukrainian: Nyzhnia Apsha/Dibrova, Hungarian: Also-Apsa)
  - **Danylovo** (Romanian: Dănilești, Hungarian: Sofalva)
  - Dulovo (Romanian: Duleni, Hungarian: Dulfalva)
  - Ganychi (Romanian: Gănești, Hungarian: Ganya)
  - Poiana Cobâlea (Ukrainian: Kobyletska Poliana, Hungarian: Gyergyanliget)
  - **Kolodne** (Darva in Romanian and Hungarian)
  - **Krainykovo** (Romanian: Crăinicești, formerly Steblivka between 1919–1938 and 1945–1946, Hungarian: Mihalka Dulfalva)
  - Neresnytsia (Romanian: Nereșnița, Hungarian: Neresznicze)
  - **Nyzhnie Selyshche** (Romanian: Săliștea de Jos, Hungarian: Szelistye)
  - **Olexandrivka** (Romanian: Sândreni, Hungarian: Sandorfalva)
  - Ruska Pole I (Romanian: Domneștii Mari, Hungarian: Urmezo)
  - Ruska Pole II (Romanian: Domneștii Mici)
  - **Sokyrnytsia** (Romanian: Săclânța, Hungarian: Szeklencze)
  - Steblivka (Romanian: Duboșari, Hungarian: Szaldobos)
  - Ternovo (Romanian: Târnova, Hungarian: Kokenyes)

== Gallery ==
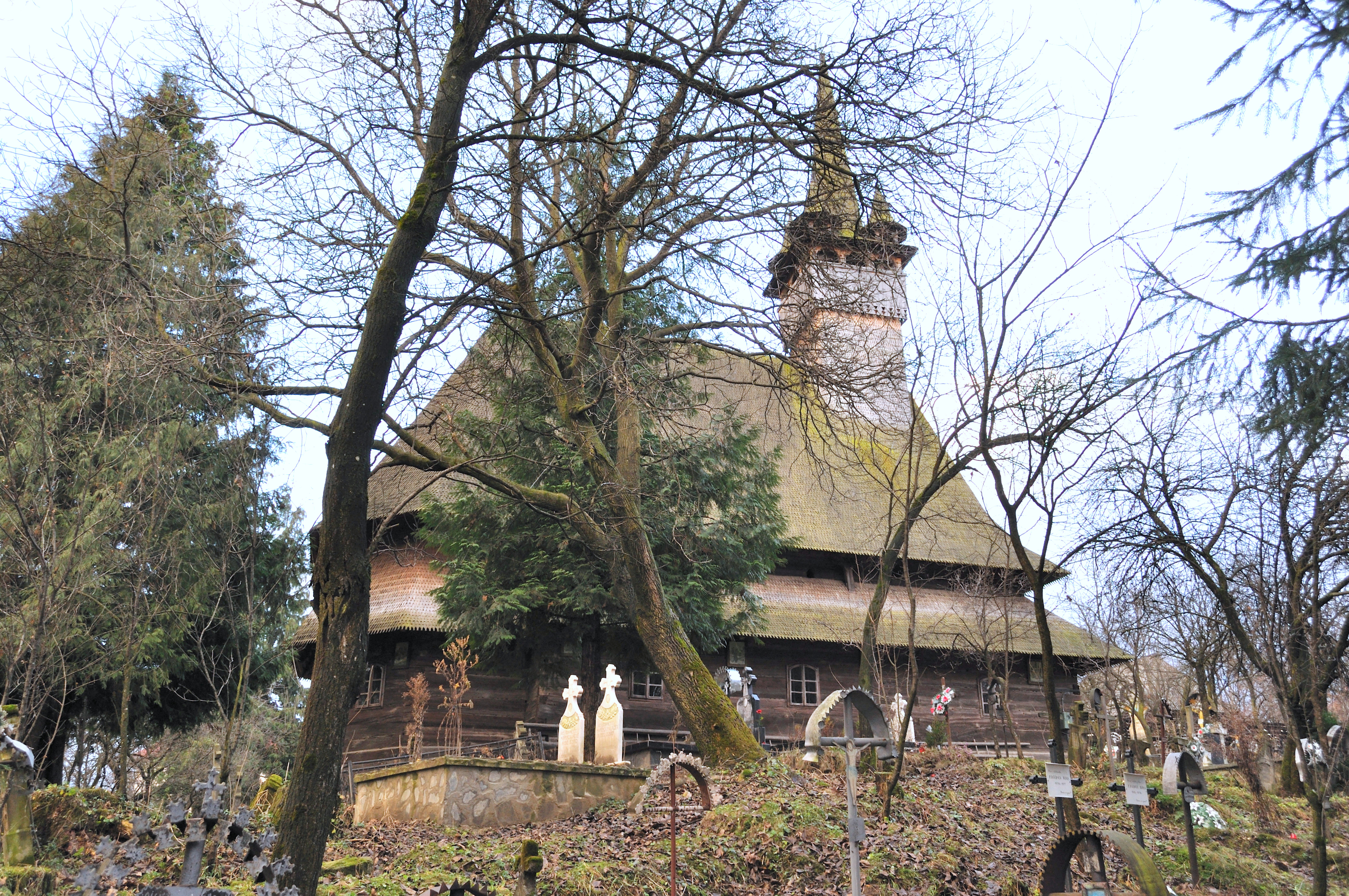
Budești Josani church

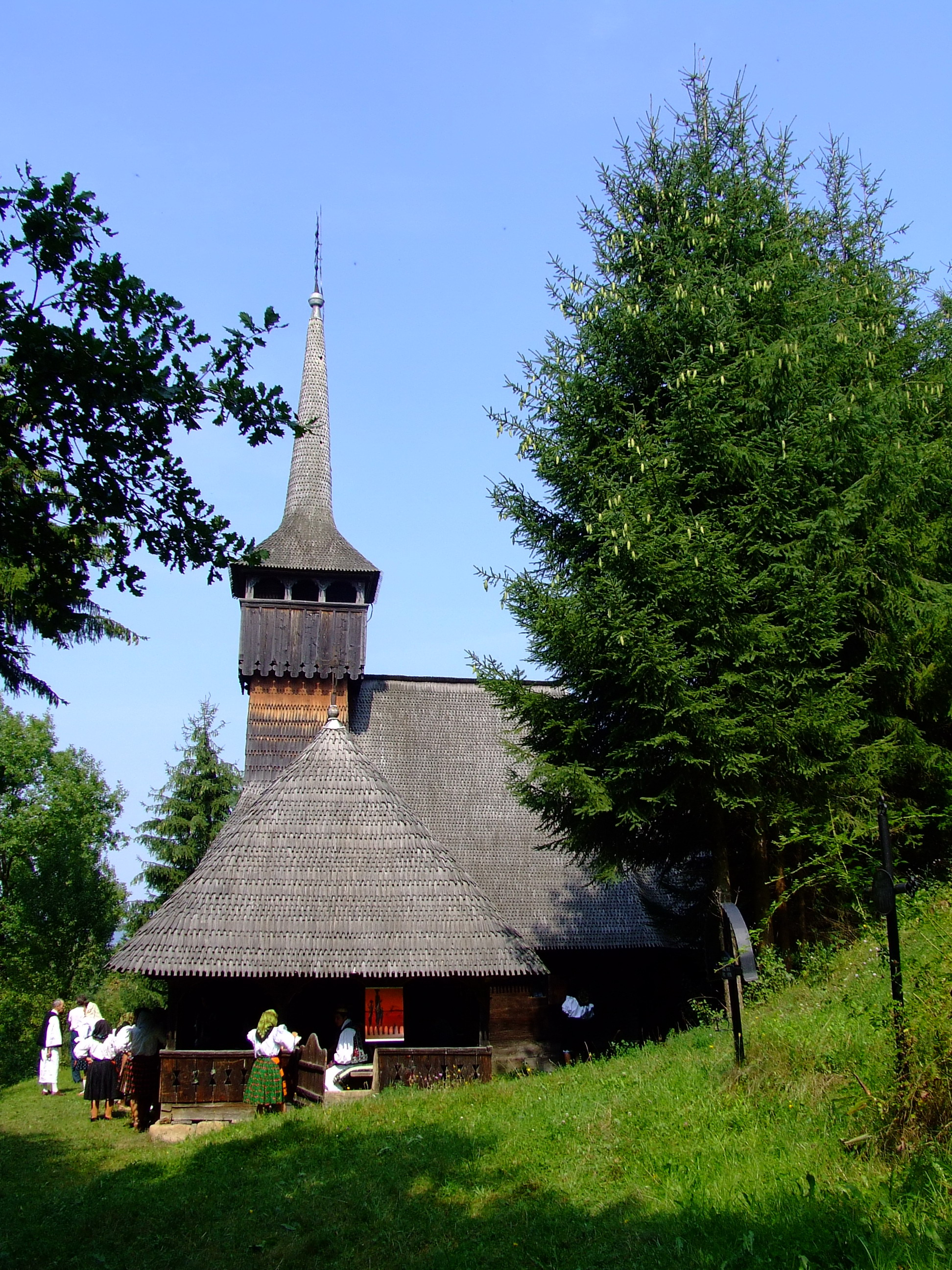
Călinești Căeni church

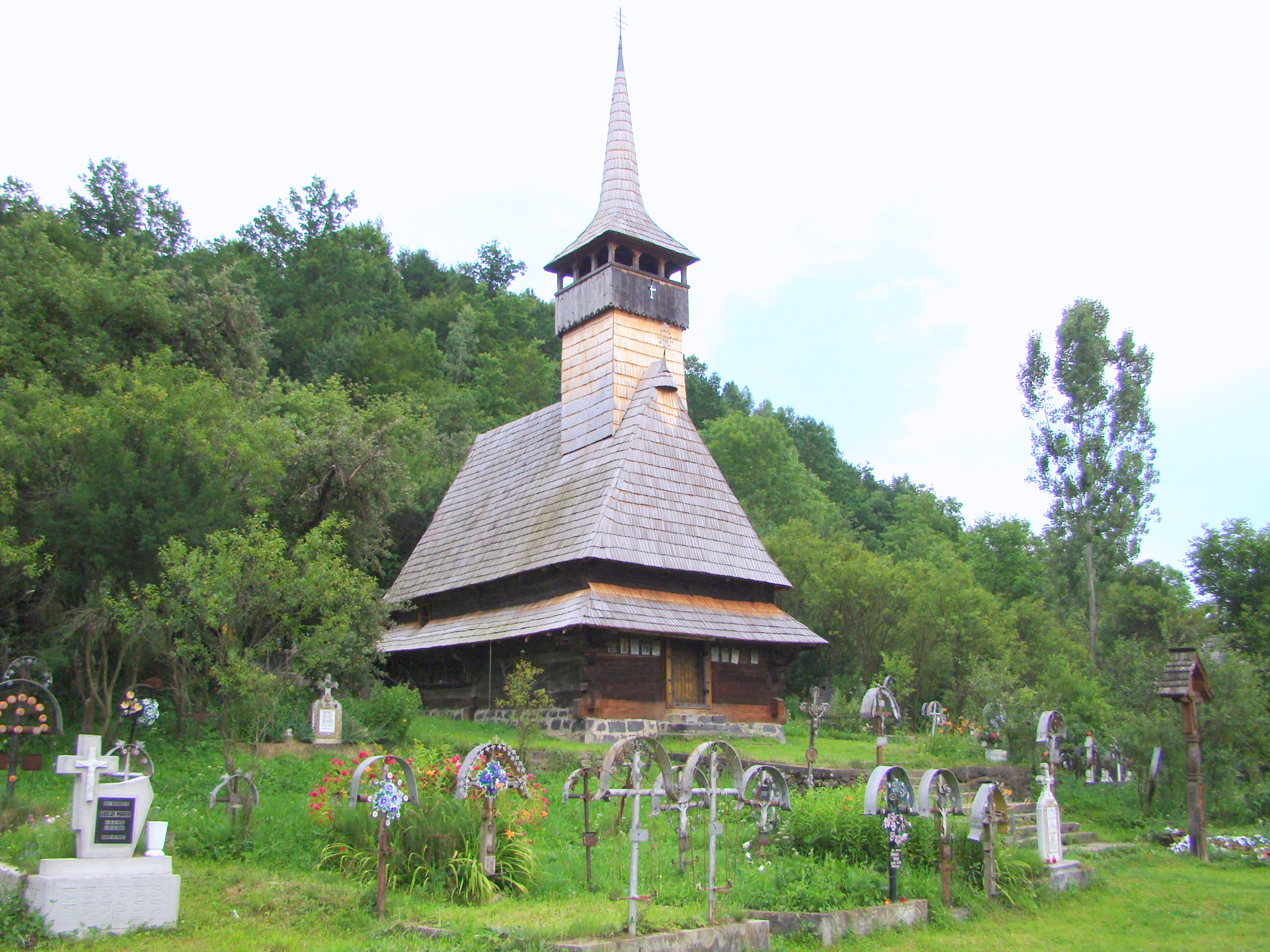
Cornești church

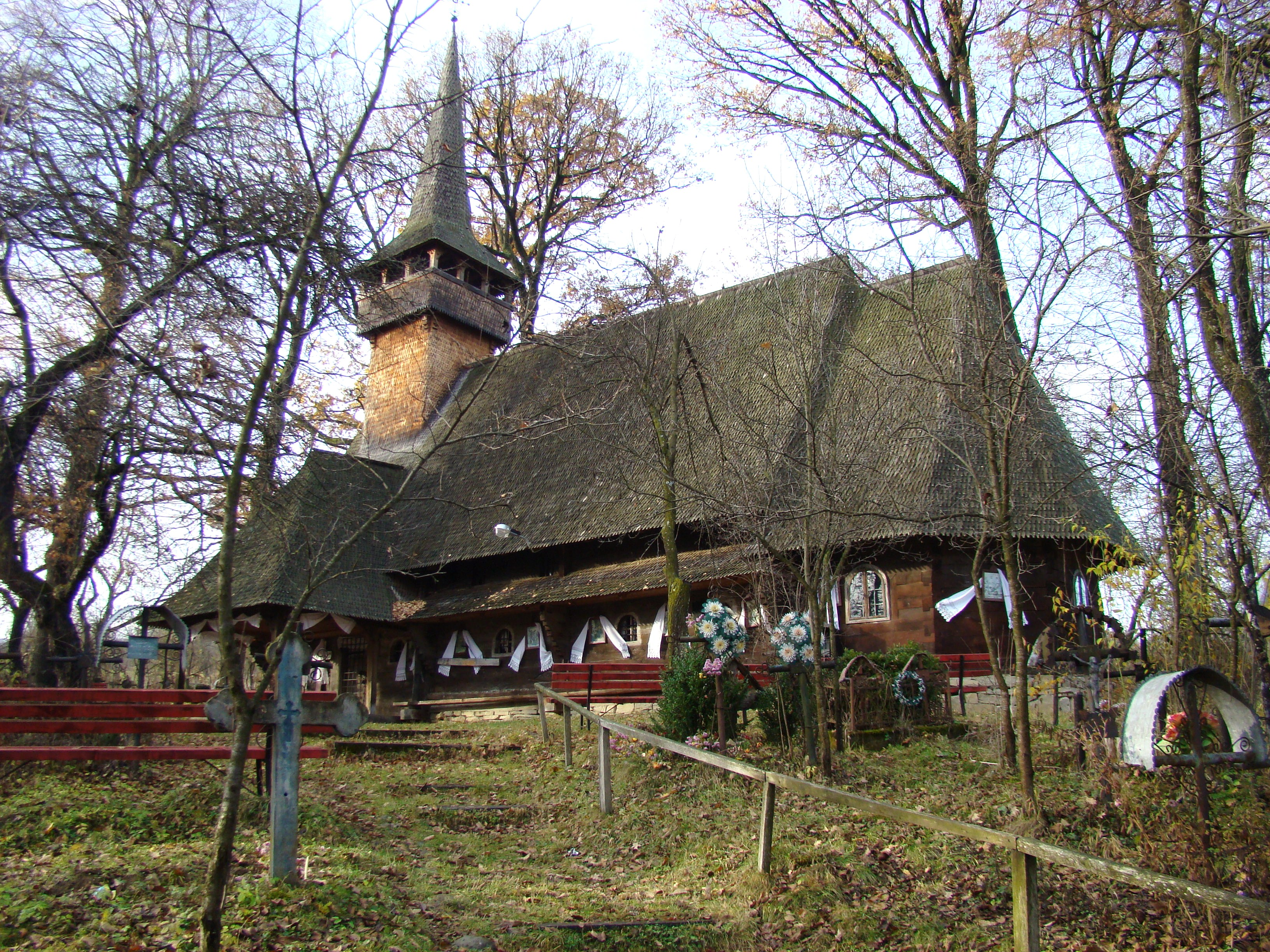
Hărnicești church

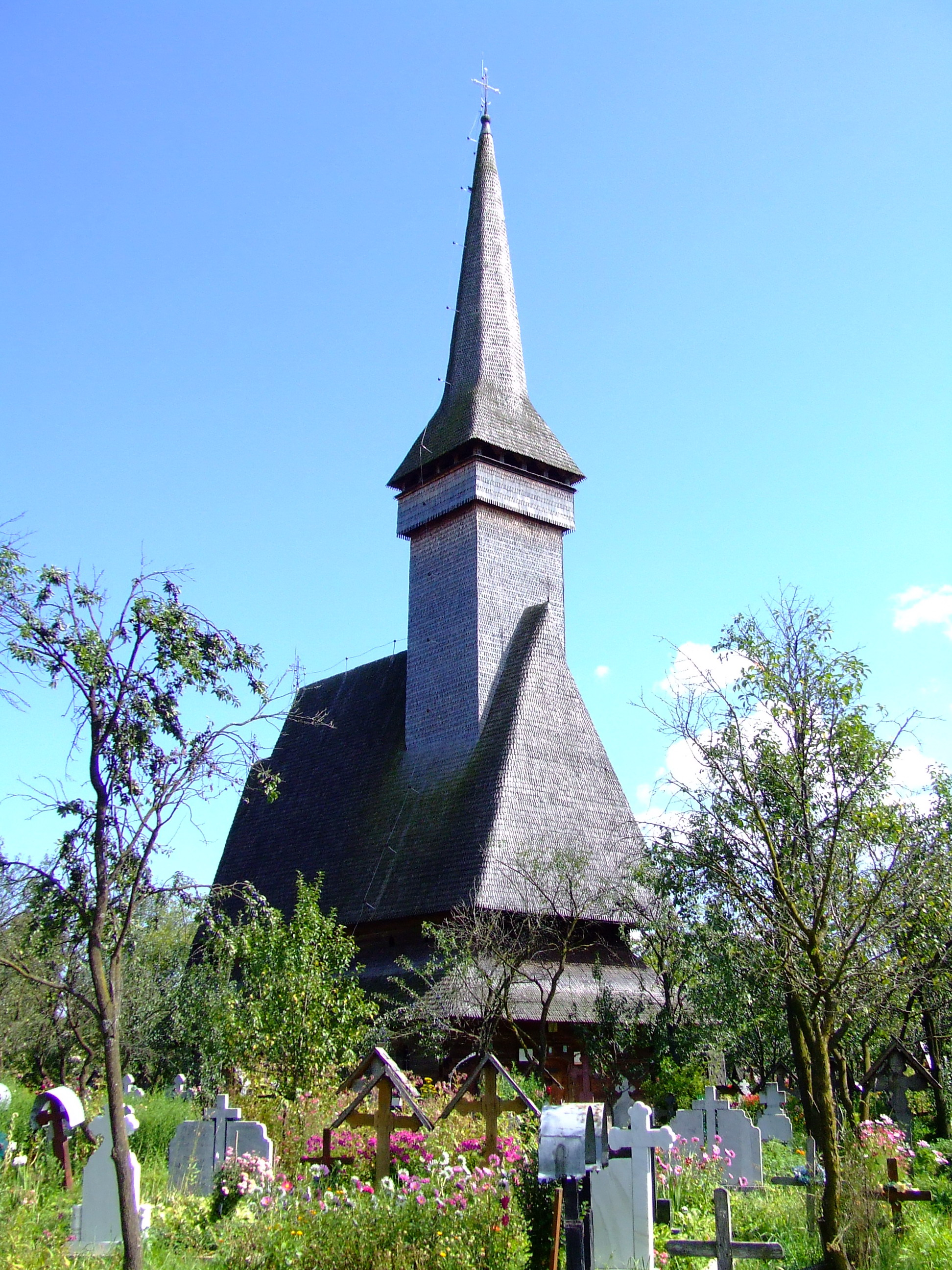
Ieud Șes church

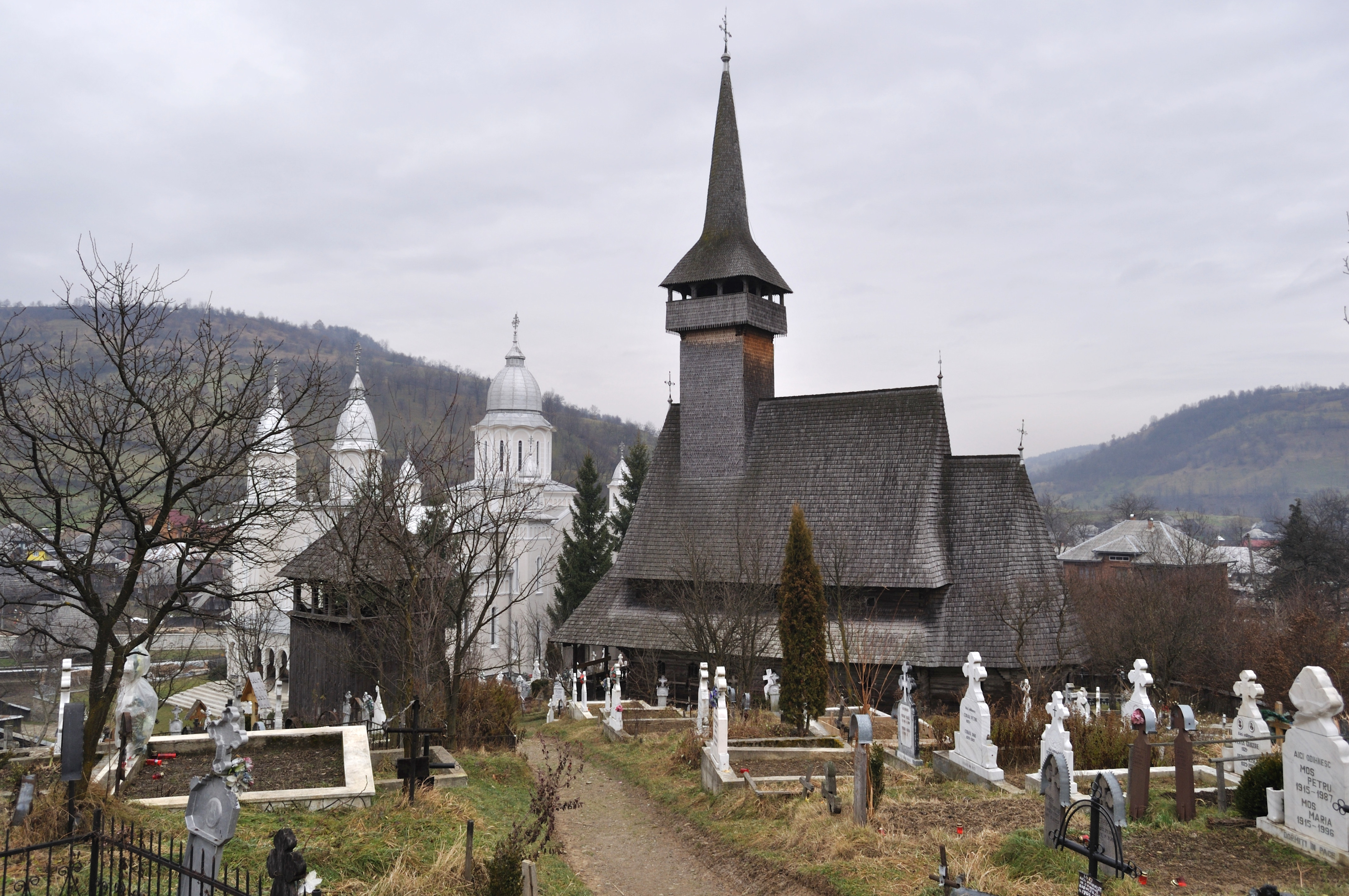
Botiza church

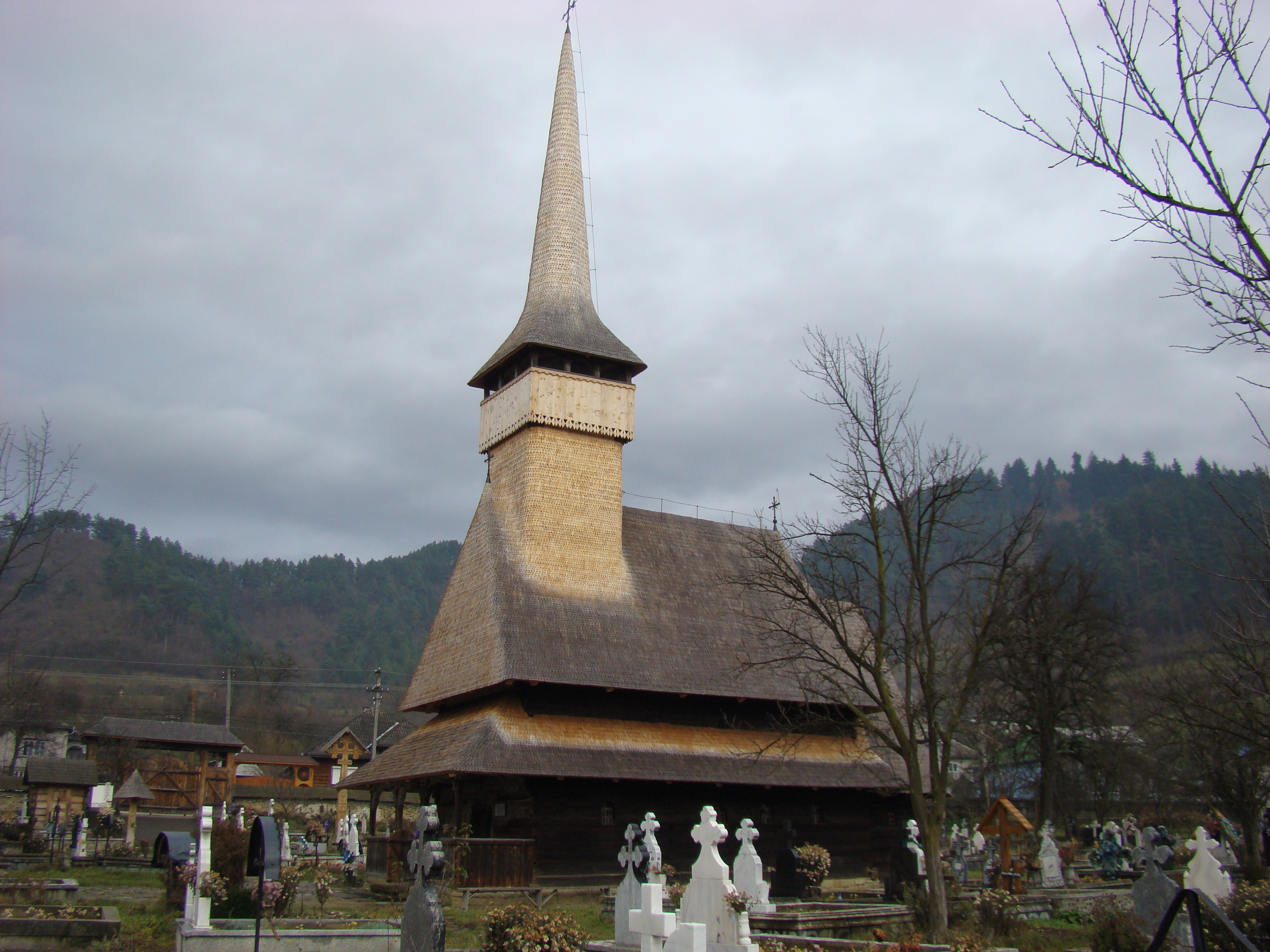
Rozavlea church

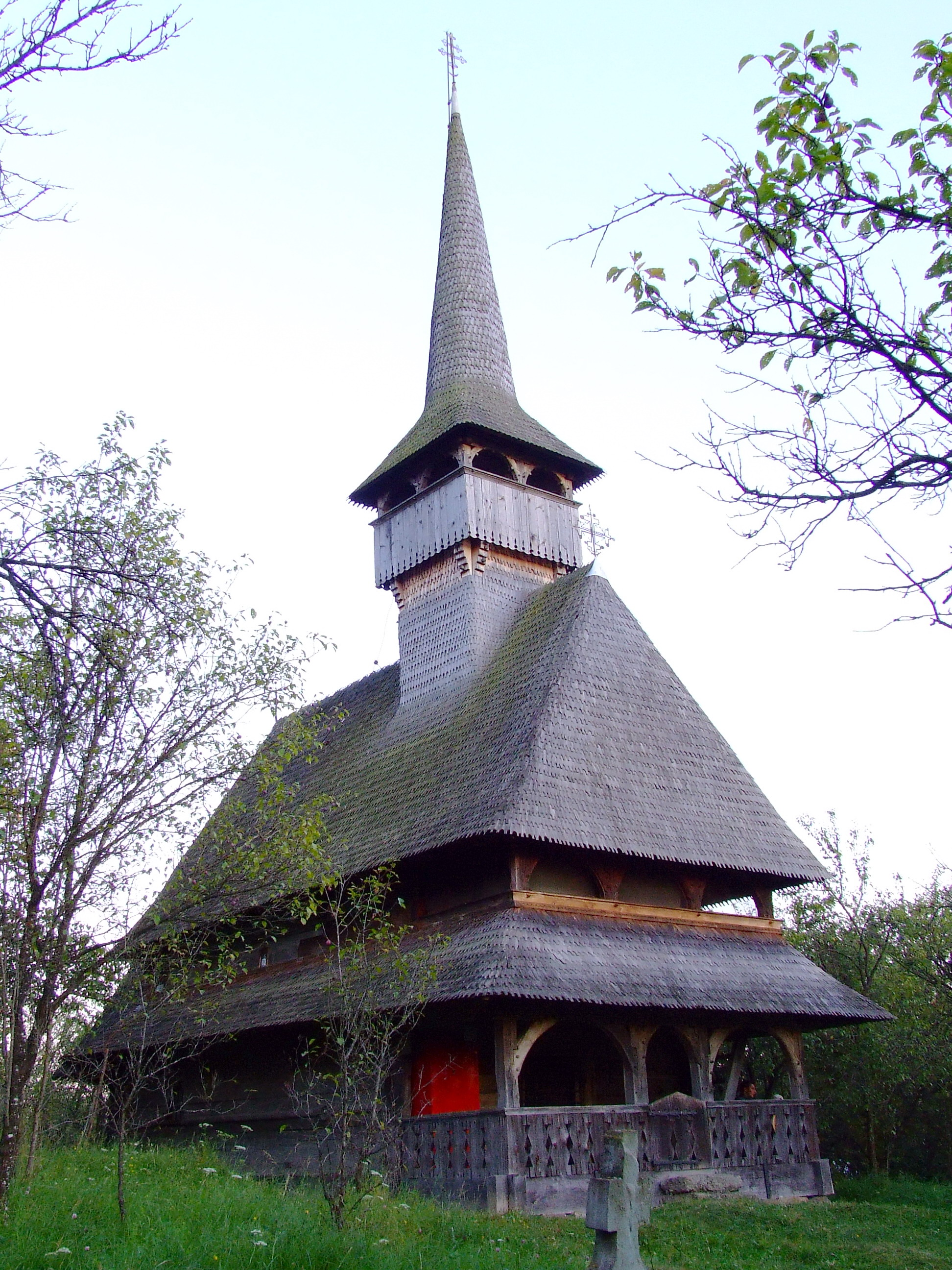
Bârsana church

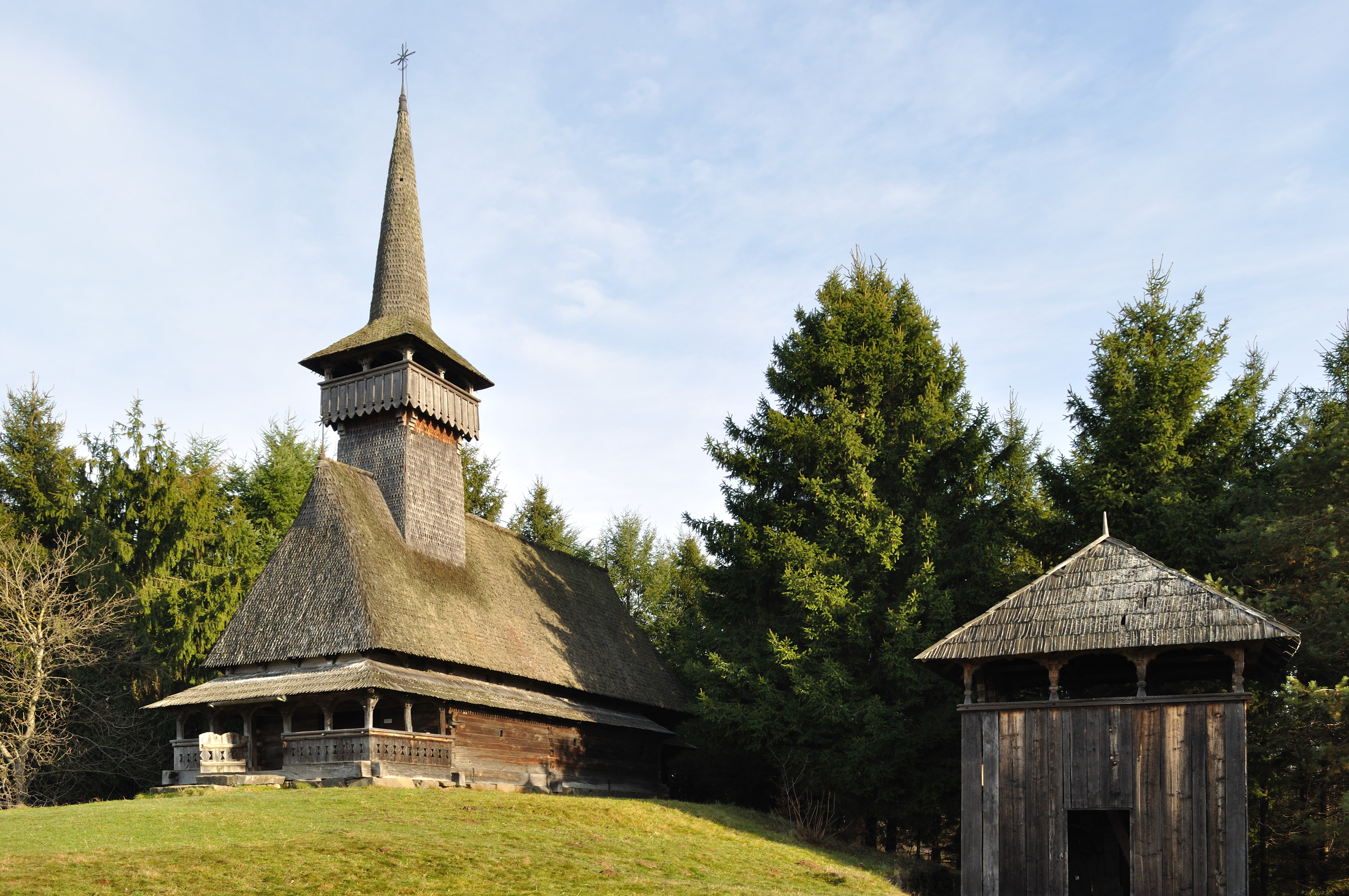
Oncești church

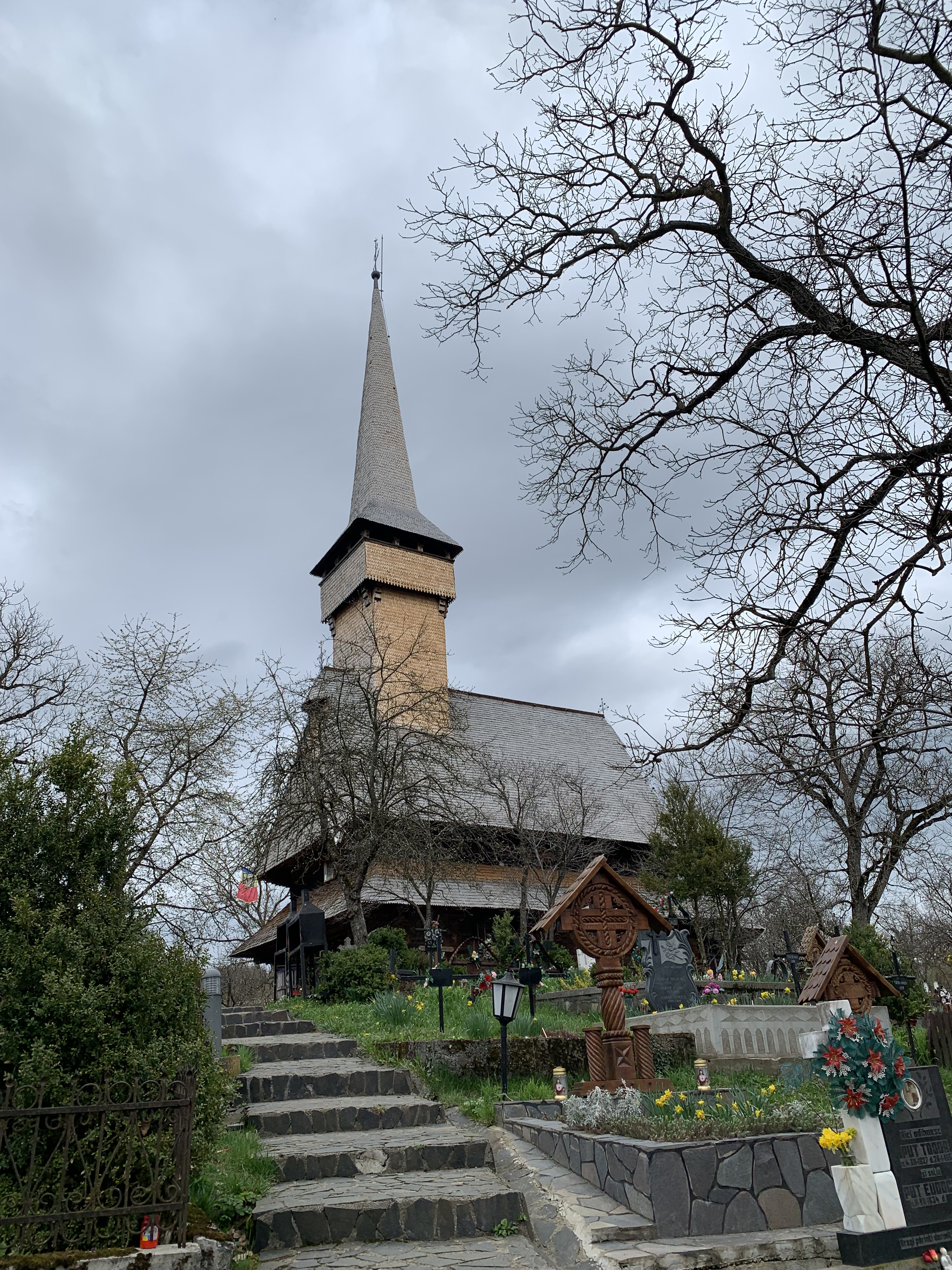
Desești Church

== See also ==
- List of World Heritage Sites in Romania
- Vernacular architecture of the Carpathians
- Carpathian wooden churches
