= Church of the Archangels Michael and Gabriel, Șurdești =

Greek-Catholic church in Maramureș County, Romania

Church of the Archangels Michael and Gabriel
- Biserica de lemn din Șurdești
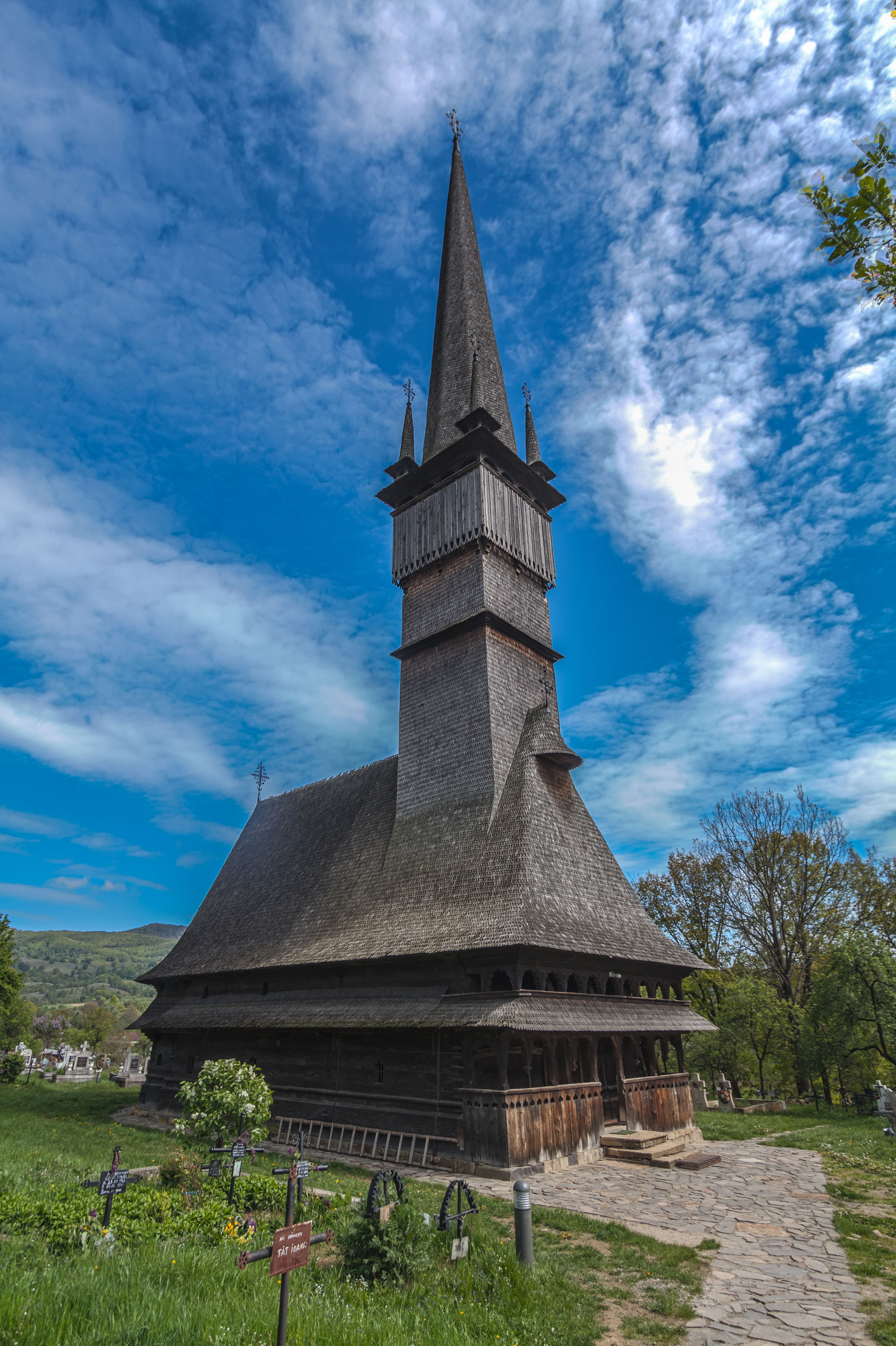
- Church of the Archangels Michael and Gabriel
- Address: Șișești, Maramureș
- Country: Romania
- Denomination: Greek-Catholic Church

History
- Status: active church

Architecture
- Completed: 1721

Administration
- Diocese: Diocese of Maramureș and Sătmar

UNESCO World Heritage Site
- Part of: Wooden Churches of Maramureş
- Criteria: Cultural: (iv)
- Reference: 904
- Inscription: 1999 (23rd Session)

The Church of the Archangels Michael and Gabriel is a Greek-Catholic church in Șurdești village, Șișești Commune, Maramureș County, Romania. Built in 1721, it is one of eight buildings that make up the wooden churches of Maramureș UNESCO World Heritage Site, and is also listed as a historic monument by the country's Ministry of Culture and Religious Affairs.

== See also ==
- Catholic Church in Romania
