= Budești Josani church =

Church of Saint Nicholas
- Biserica de lemn din Budești Josani
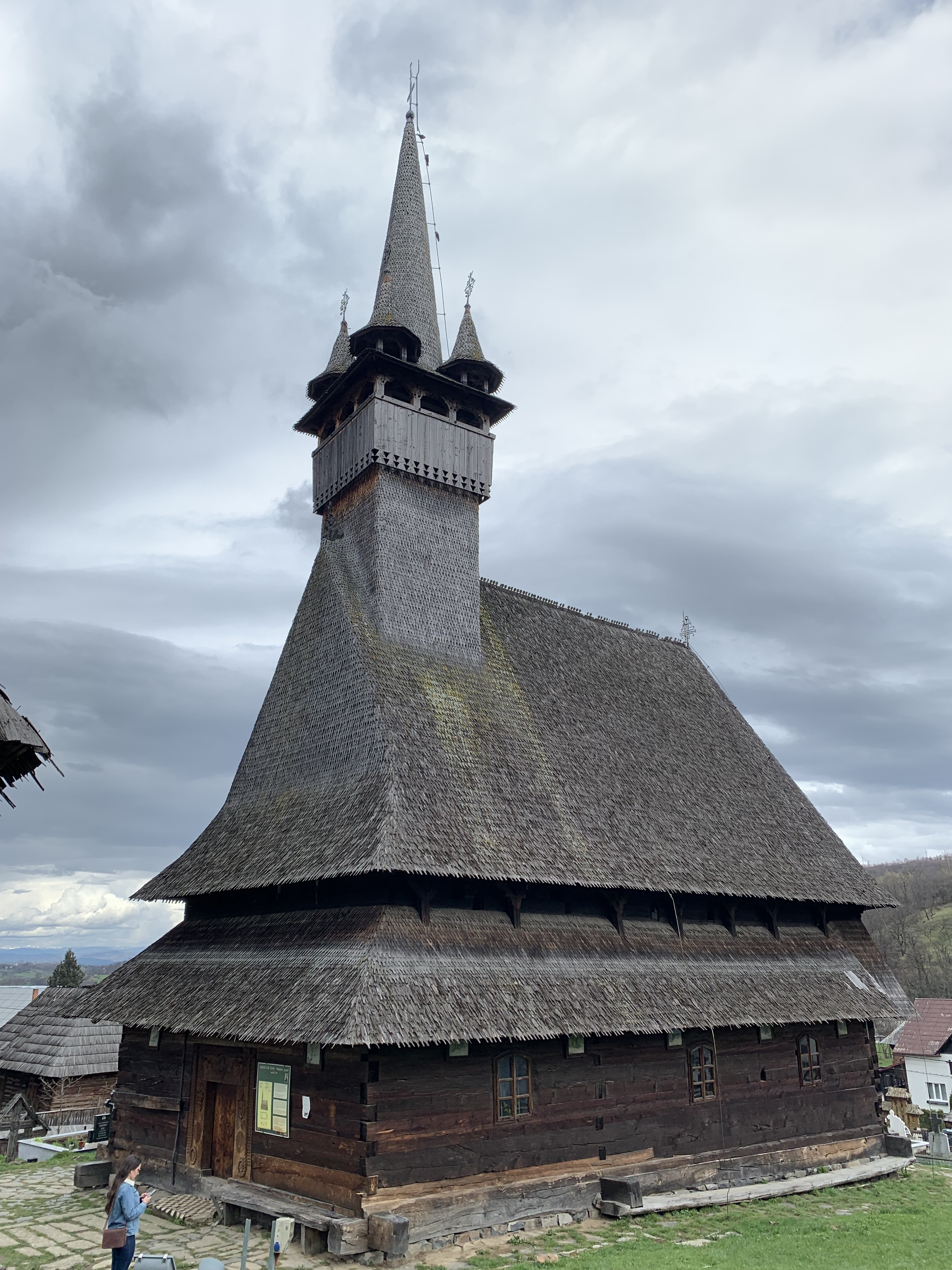
- The church in 2023
- Church of Saint Nicholas
- Address: Budești, Maramureș
- Country: Romania
- Denomination: Eastern Orthodox

History
- Status: active church

Architecture
- Completed: 1643

Administration
- Diocese: Diocese of Maramureș and Sătmar

UNESCO World Heritage Site
- Part of: Wooden Churches of Maramureş
- Criteria: Cultural: (iv)
- Reference: 904-002
- Inscription: 1999 (23rd Session)

The church of Saint Nicholas in Budești Josani ("Lower Budești") in the village of Budeşti in the region of Maramureș, Cosău valley in Romania is representative of the characteristic wooden churches of Maramureș with double eaves. It is one of eight wooden churches of Maramureș that UNESCO has listed as a World Heritage Site.

== Construction ==
The wooden church at Budești Josani was dated by an inscription on the portal from 1643. Unfortunately the inscription was lost during the enlargement of the entrance in 1923. The inscription was verified dendrochronologically and the log structure was firmly dated from the winter 1642–43, i.e. the moment the timbers were felled. This church appears to have been built by the same master carpenter who built the wooden churches at Slătioara (before 1639) and Sârbi Susani (1639).

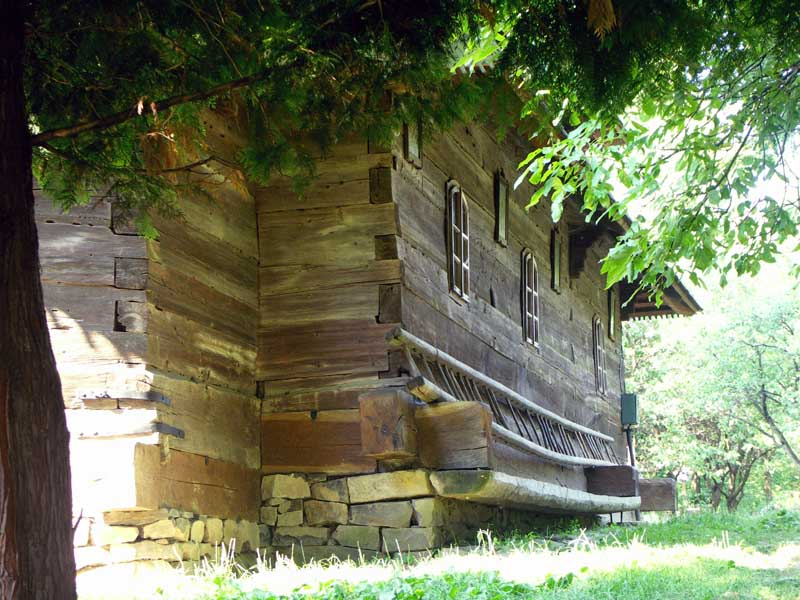
Budești Josani, the southern side. Photo: A Baboș, July 2006

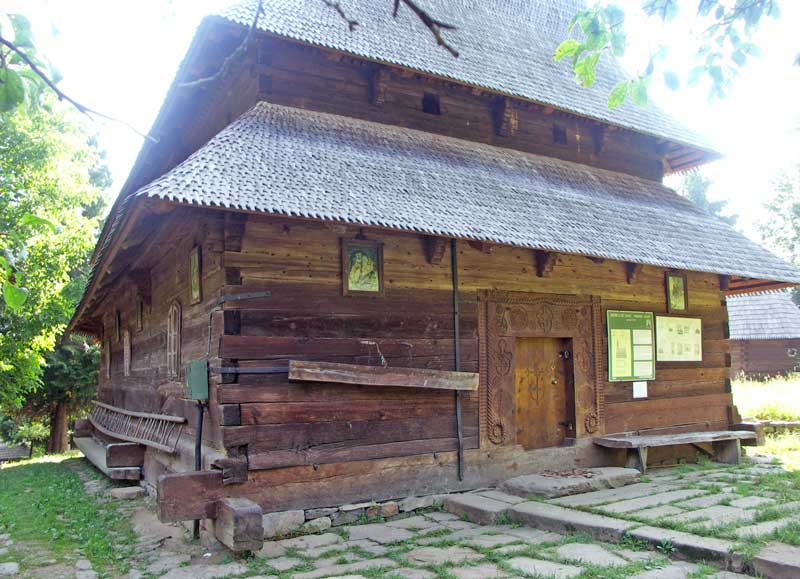
Budești Josani, the reconstructed entrance after renovation 2002. Photo: A Baboş, July 2006
