= Călinești Susani church =

Church in Maramureș, Romania

Coordinates: 47°47′4″N 23°57′55″E

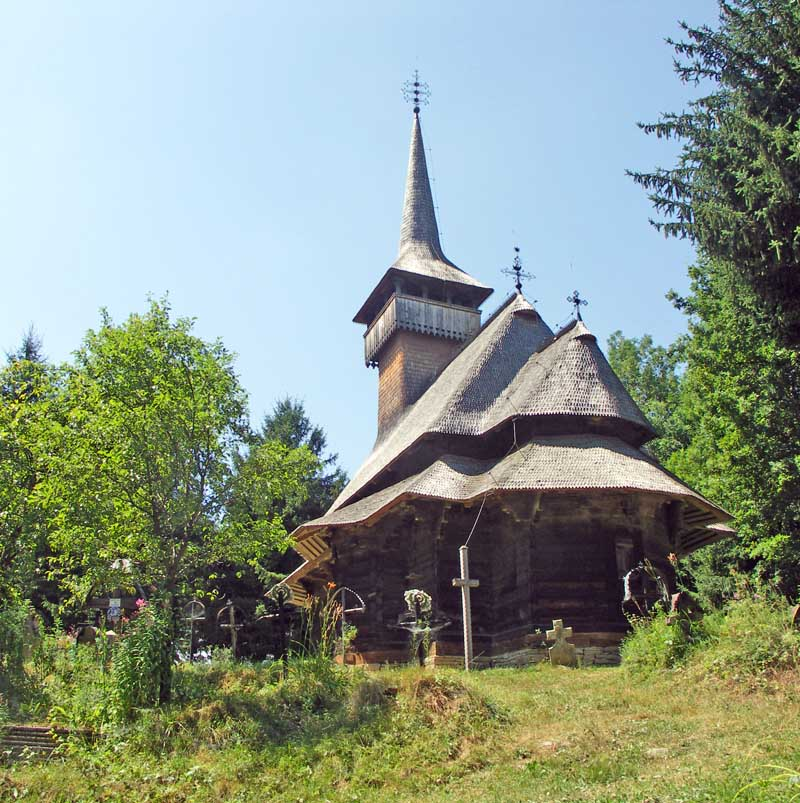
Călinești Susani from the rear

The Călinești Susani church stands in the village of Călinești, in the Maramureș region of northern Romania. Situated in the Cosău valley, this church is representative for the Moldavian-inspired wooden churches of Maramureș, retaining though the local characteristic roof with two eaves.

== Construction ==
The wooden church from Călinești Susani was built isolated on a height above the village, a drastic measure after the previous one in the middle of the village had caught fire from the neighbouring farms. The present church is dated by an inscription on the portal of the entrance from 1784. This church appears to have been built by the same master carpenter as those from Glod (before 1784) and Poienile de sub Munte (1798). The interior was painted by Nicolae Cepschin in 1788.

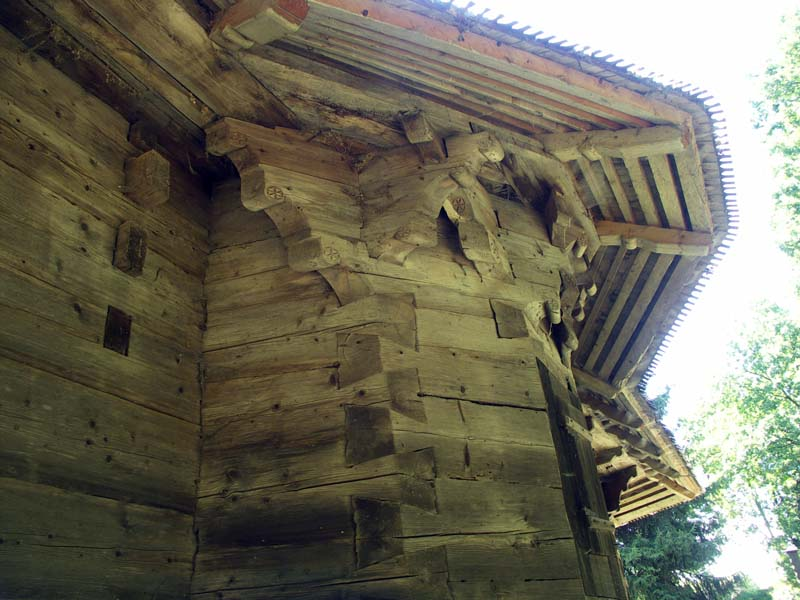
Călinești Susani: the consoles under the lower eaves around the northern apse

== Features ==
According to the local tradition, the carpenters were two brothers who fled probably from Moldavia. The church was built during the pastorate of Ignat Opriș and Filip Zob Opriș, the later ordained in 1733 in Iași by the metropolitan Antoniu of Moldavia. The present church, as its forerunner, was named a Băndrenilor, after the noble founder family Șerba, nicknamed Băndreni. We do not know with whose permission the itinerant church carpenters had started the construction of an unfamiliar Moldavian church with lateral apses here, yet, the local tradition remembers the villagers became very upset for this and discharged the carpenters from their started work. Not until they succeeded to build another church, in Glod more like a local one, they were entrusted to continue their work in Călinești Susani. After their return, they seem also to have changed the plans, probably in agreement with the founders, and completed the church with the characteristic narrowed superstructure and a tower, like any other traditional church with two eaves.

The church from Călinești Susani is one of the most unusual wooden constructions from Maramureș. Several art historians interpreted the features of this church. Victor Brătulescu believed that "in the plan entered some elements from the Russian architecture", but Coriolan Petranu replied him that the Russian influence "is not proved and hard to believe". According to Vasile Drăguț, the church from Călinești Susani "is a precious witness of the Moldavian influence in Maramureș". Marius Porumb specified that "the form of the plan of the wooden church from Călinești Susani is unusual in Maramureș" and "reminds the edifices with a trefoil plan from Moldavia". Ioana Cristache-Panait, an experienced scholar of the Moldavian wooden churches, stated that "the Moldavian carpenters, inspired by the masonry architecture, created during the 18th century a new type of plan for the wooden churches, by adding the lateral apses. ... From here, without knowing borders, the typological creation of the Moldavian carpenters passed also into Maramureș, at the Church of the Nativity of the Blessed Virgin Mary from Călinești Susani".

As it was remarked by others, the most distinctive feature of this construction is the plan with its lateral apses. The entrance of the church was placed on the south and its threshold is the long southern ground sill, laid first over the stones of the foundation. The western part of the narthex ends polygonal, with three short walls. At the opposite side, the sanctuary has also a polygonal shape with five outer walls. In the middle it is the nave, enlarged on both lateral sides by two polygonal apses, also with five short outer walls. Behind the iconostasis, on both sides of the sanctuary, but unobserved from outside, there are two rectangular pockets like rooms used as prothesis and diaconicon. In Moldavia, Ioana Cristache-Panait mentioned about 30 wooden churches with a similar trefoil plan. The church was built 7 m wide for about 95 men and 75 women, which was a medium-sized parish at that time. Inside the nave there is a choir loft that much probably was built at the same time with the church, and there can about 45 children, young men and women attend the service, apart from their parents. As in the plan, the church continues to respect the Moldavian constructive tradition in the lower part of its elevation. The lower walls were erected 3.7 m high, higher than the half of the width of the church. The uppermost timbers end outside the wall with cantilevers to support the eaves purlins of the lower roof. These cantilevers, high above the ground and shaped with numerous stylised heads of horses, arc very specific for Moldavia. The same can be said about the dimensions and the design of the portals, windows and openings in the wall between men and women. The consoles inside the nave and sanctuary, and the cross beams supporting the flat ceiling over the narthex are all adorned with filigree like decoration. The large eaves formed by the long ends of the lower rafters and the typical continuous roof over the apses and all around the church complete the list of Moldavian features.

The much the lower part of the church represents the Moldavian school as much the superstructure, the double roof and the tower belong to the local constructive tradition. The contrasting fusion between the two models of wooden churches is actually the innovating feature of this church. The superstructure was superimposed on consoles above the lower fabric, designed in the west with a polygonal shape, like the western part of the narthex underneath. Two small upper windows on each long side of the nave give the church its basilica appearance. The upper frame of the roof consists of pairs of rafters tied together and stiffened by a collar. The tower was suspended above the narthex, with the four uprights supporting straight the spire of the steeple. The bell chamber is almost only an outer adornment. The church was built mainly of spruce fir timbers, but a different tree essence was used for the sills, the two portals, the frames of three large windows and for the framework of the tower. The frames of two large windows seem to be prefabricated, while the third was designed with an arched upper part topped by a cross, a motif similar with that on the portal above the entrance. The three large windows together with the small one on the west facade seem to be penetrated by the horizontal axes of the church, from east to west and from south to north, forming an invisible but present Latin;cross inside the holy house.

This church is influenced by Moldavian sacred architecture. The carpenters built a hybrid between a typical Moldavian trefoil church and a local basilica church, inspiring local builders later in the 20th century.

== Pictures ==
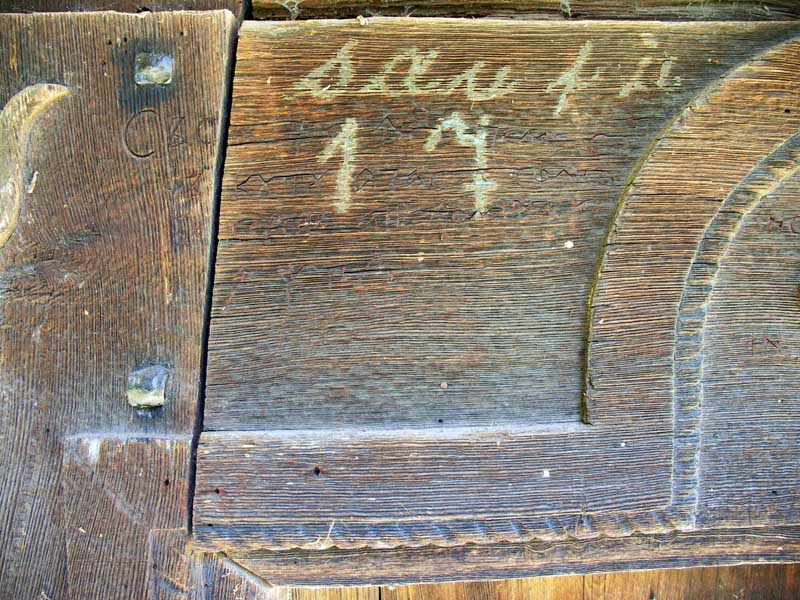
Inscription over the entrance. Photo: A Baboş 2006.

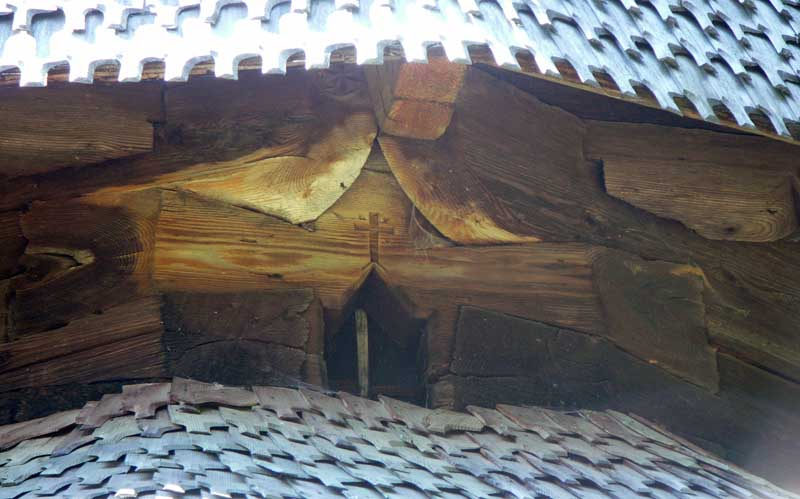
Window in between the eaves. Photo: A Baboş, 2006.

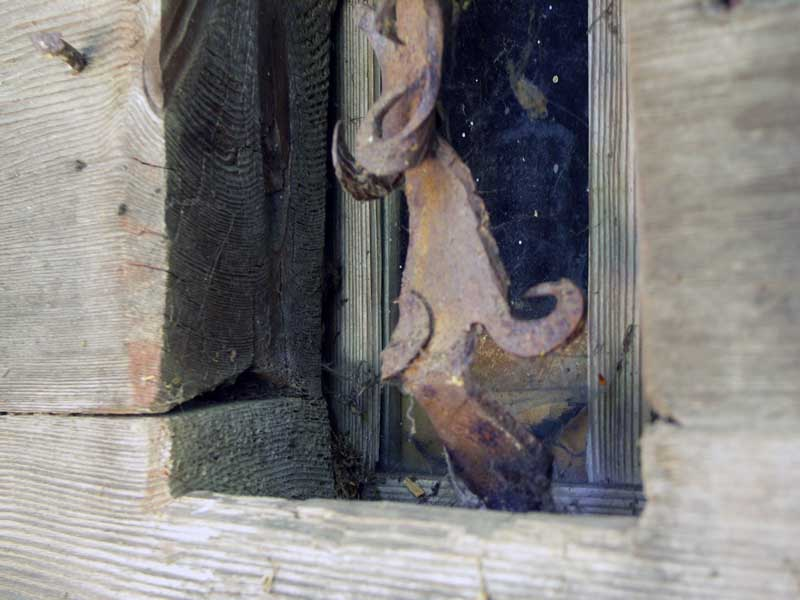
Groove in between the beams. Photo: A Baboș, 2006.
