= Church of the Presentation of the Virgin in the Temple =

Church of the Presentation of the Virgin at the Temple
- Biserica de lemn din Bârsana
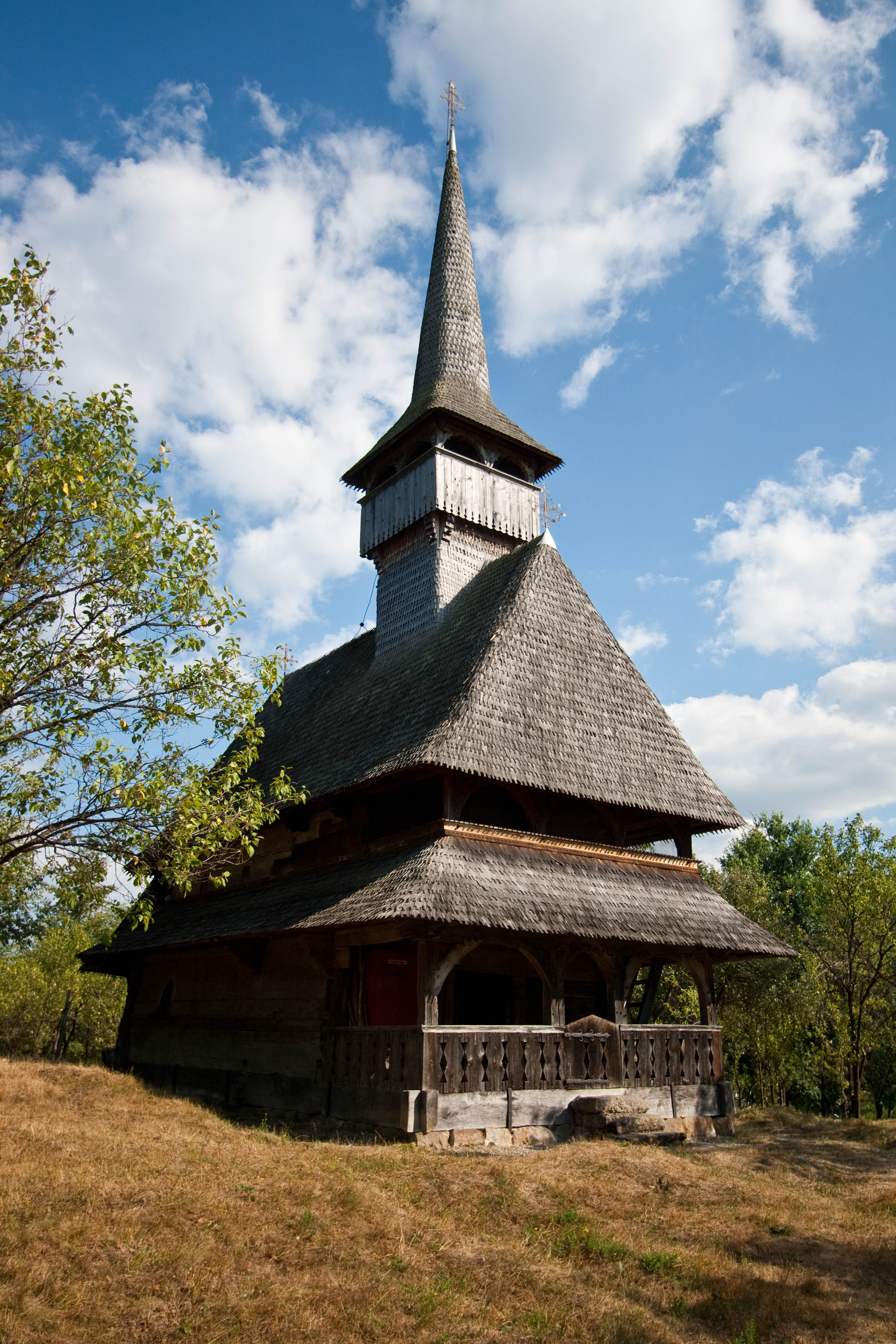
- Church of the Presentation of the Virgin at the Temple
- Address: Bârsana, Maramureș County
- Country: Romania
- Denomination: Eastern Orthodox

History
- Status: active church

Administration
- Diocese: Diocese of Maramureș and Sătmar

UNESCO World Heritage Site
- Part of: Wooden Churches of Maramureş
- Criteria: Cultural: (iv)
- Reference: 904-001
- Inscription: 1999 (23rd Session)

The Church of the Presentation of the Virgin in the Temple is part of the wooden churches of Maramureș World Heritage Site, and is located in Bârsana Commune, Maramureș County, Romania. The church was built in 1720 and it features some of the most representative baroque indoor murals in Maramureş. It has a collection of icons painted on glass and old religious books.

Its name refers to the Presentation of Mary.
