= Romanian Black Sea resorts =

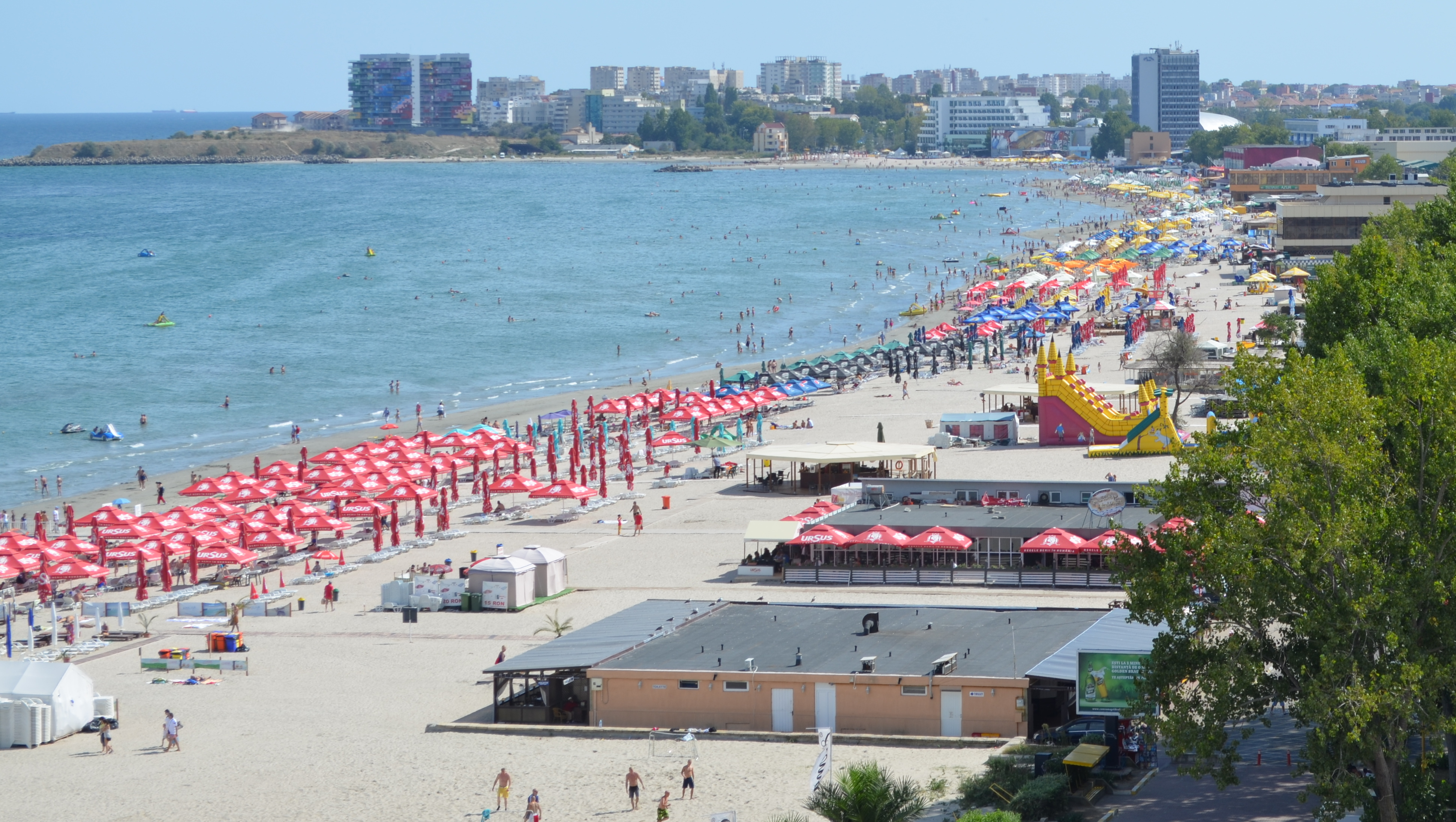
Mamaia

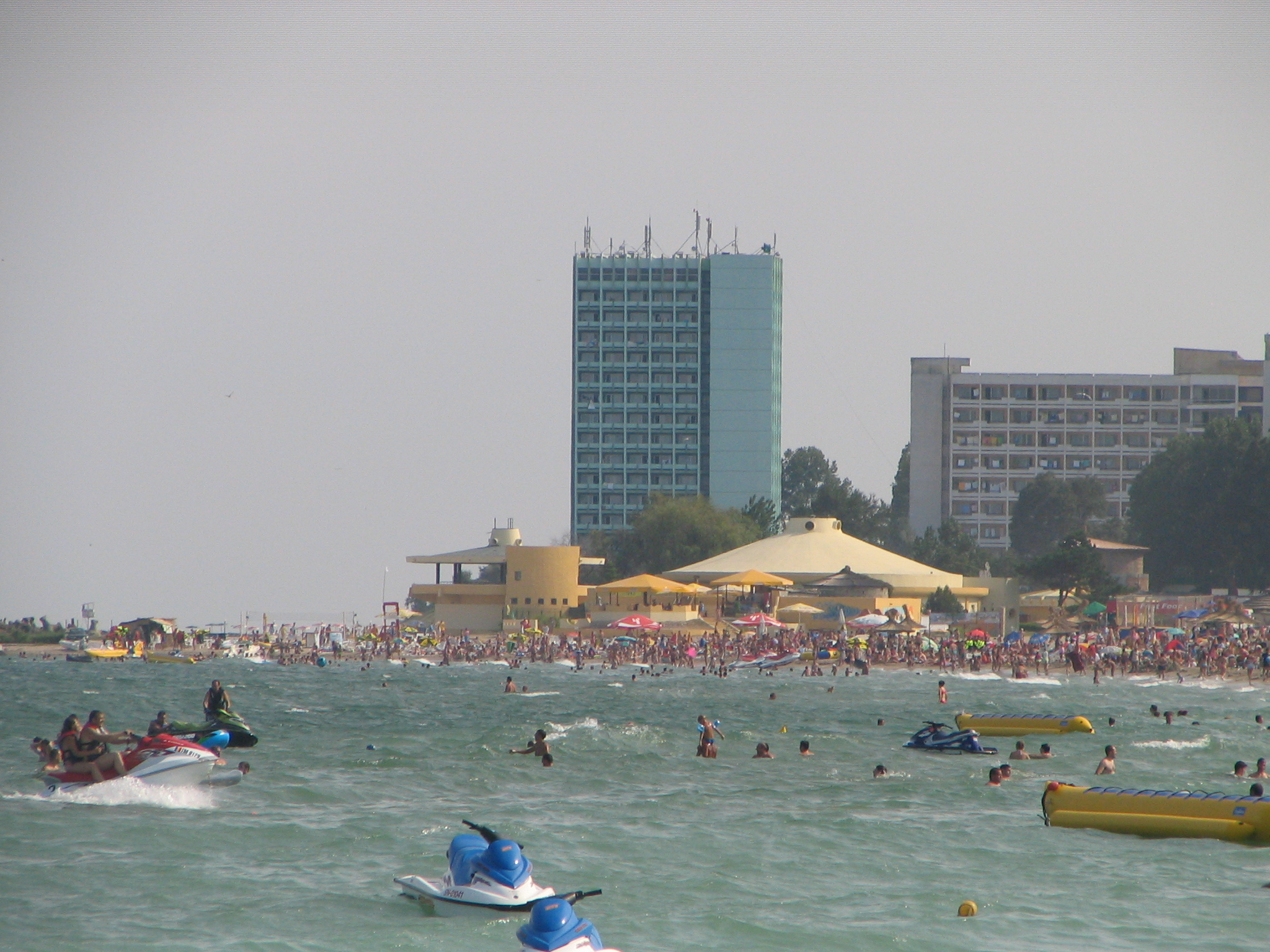
Neptun

The Romanian Black Sea resorts, or the Romanian Riviera, stretch along the Black Sea coast from the Danube Delta at the northern end down to the Bulgarian Black Sea Coast in the south, along 275 kilometers of coastline.

The most important resort is Mamaia, situated north of the city of Constanța on a narrow land slice that separates the Black Sea and Lake Siutghiol. Mamaia is a popular destination in the summer for Romanians and foreign tourists alike as a result of major investments in tourist infrastructure.

Other important resorts have names from Roman and Greek mythology, such as Eforie Nord, Neptun, Venus, Saturn, Jupiter, and Olimp.

Other resorts include Eforie Sud, 2 Mai, and Cap Aurora. Further, Costinești is the traditional students' resort, while Vama Veche, in the extreme south bordering Bulgaria, is a fishing village well known for its hippie atmosphere.

The main cities in the region are Constanța (Romania's largest port), Mangalia, Năvodari, and Sulina. All of these (except Sulina) are located in Constanta County, one of two Romanian counties with a coastline. In Tulcea County, the largest resort is Gura Portiței.

The Romanian Black Sea Riviera is served by Constanța Airport, which is connected to the main European capitals through charter flights during the summer season.

== See also ==
- Tourism in Romania
- Riviera, featuring links to articles on the many coastal strips around the world which are known as Riviera
