= Neptun, Romania =

Neptune Station Stațiunea Neptun
- Beach
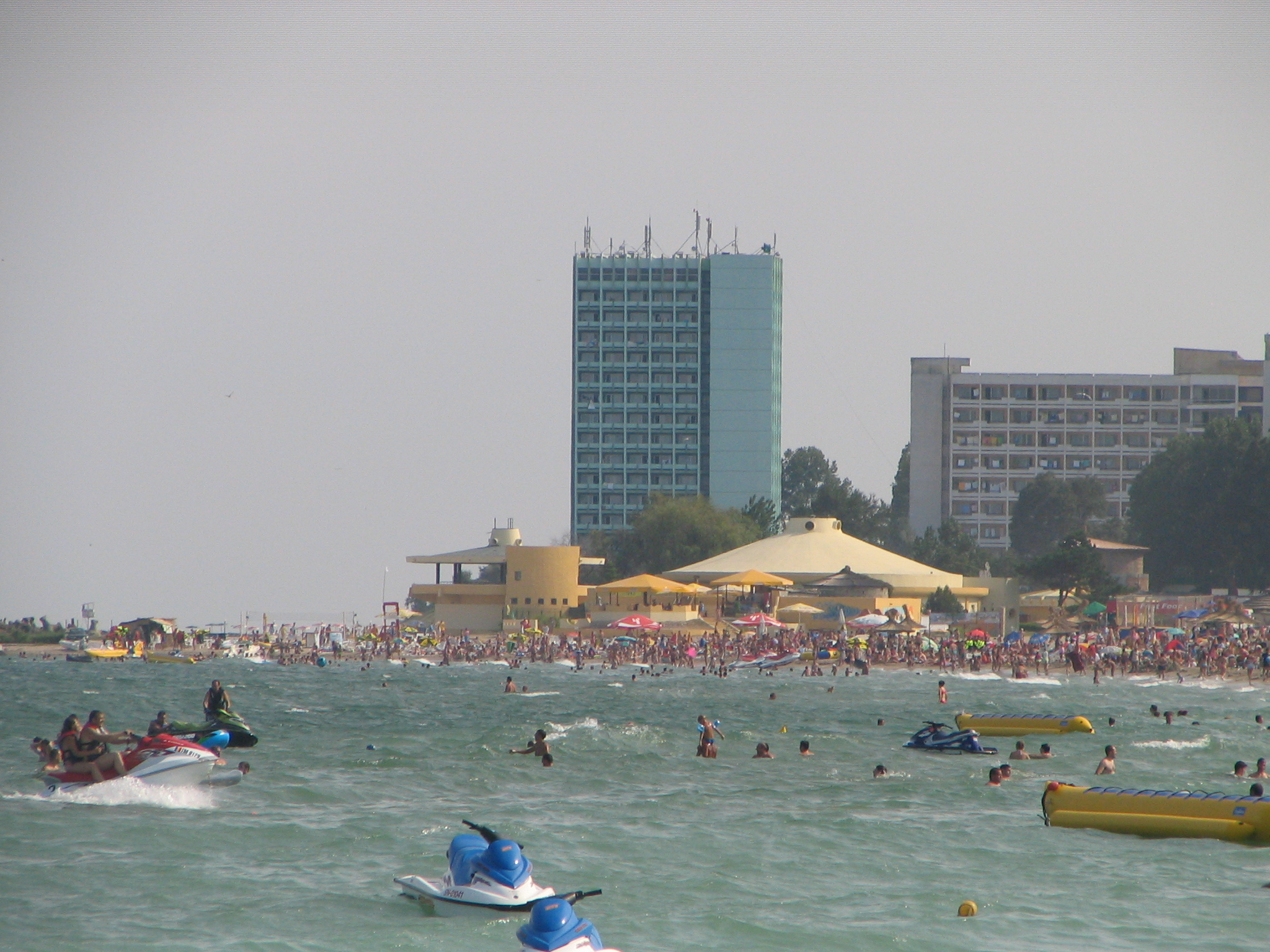
- The beach

- Location in Romania
- Coordinates: 43°51′58″N 28°36′19″E

Population (2011)
  - Total: ~1,000

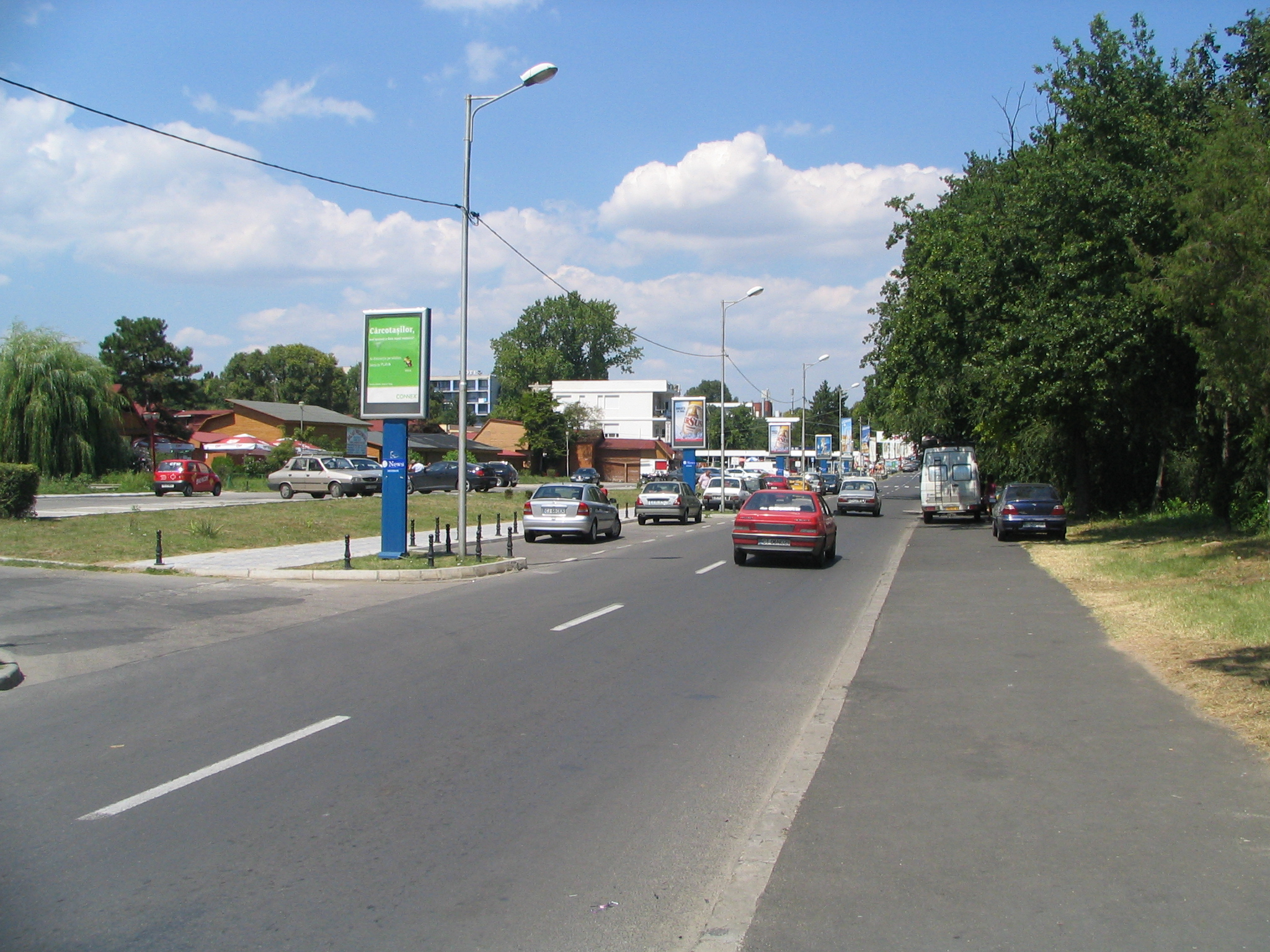
The resort

Neptun is a summer resort on the Romanian seacoast, on the Black Sea, six kilometres (3 1/2 miles) north of Mangalia. It is part of a string of such resorts, Olimp, Jupiter, Cap Aurora, and Venus.

== History ==
Neptun hosts the summer residence of the former president Klaus Iohannis, Nufărul (English: The Water Lily).

Built in 1972, it is owned by the Importanne Resort corporation. Located on a beach called "La steaguri" (English: At the flags).

== Climate ==
The marine climate has hot summers, with the average temperature in June being over 22 °C, most of the days being sunny, and winters being gentle with rare snows. The mean annual temperature is 11.2 °C, and precipitation is low (under 400 mm yearly).

== Notable people ==
- Inna – Romanian singer, winner of two MTV Europe Music Awards and best-selling music act from Eastern Europe of the 2000s
