= Port of Mangalia =

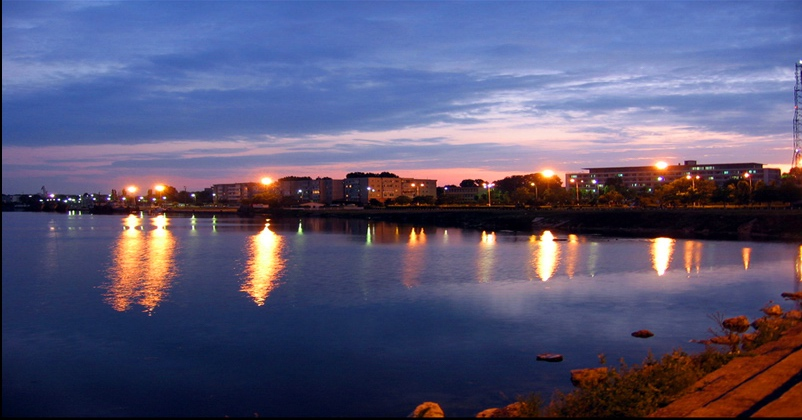
- Click on the map for a fullscreen view

Location
- Country: Romania
- Location: Constanța County
- Coordinates: 43°49′N 28°35′E
- UN/LOCODE: ROMAG

Details
- Owned by: Compania Națională Administrația Porturilor Maritime Constanța
- Type of harbour: Natural/Artificial
- Size of harbour: 1.15 square kilometres
- Land area: 0.27 square kilometres
- Size: 142.2 hectares (1.42 square kilometres)
- No. of berths: 4
- General manager: Constantin Matei

Statistics
- Annual cargo tonnage: 203,000 tonnes (2006)
- Website www.portofconstantza.com/mangalia

The Port of Mangalia is situated on the Black Sea, located in the city of Mangalia close to the southern border with Bulgaria, and over 260 km north of Istanbul. It covers 142.19 ha of which 27.47 ha is land and 114.72 ha is water.

The combined length of the north and south breakwaters is 2.74 km. There are 4 berths totaling 540 meters in length, 2 of which are operational. Maximum depth is 9 meters.

The Port of Mangalia is mainly used by the Constanța Shipyard.

== See also ==
- Mangalia Marina
