= Venus, Romania =

Venus
- Beach
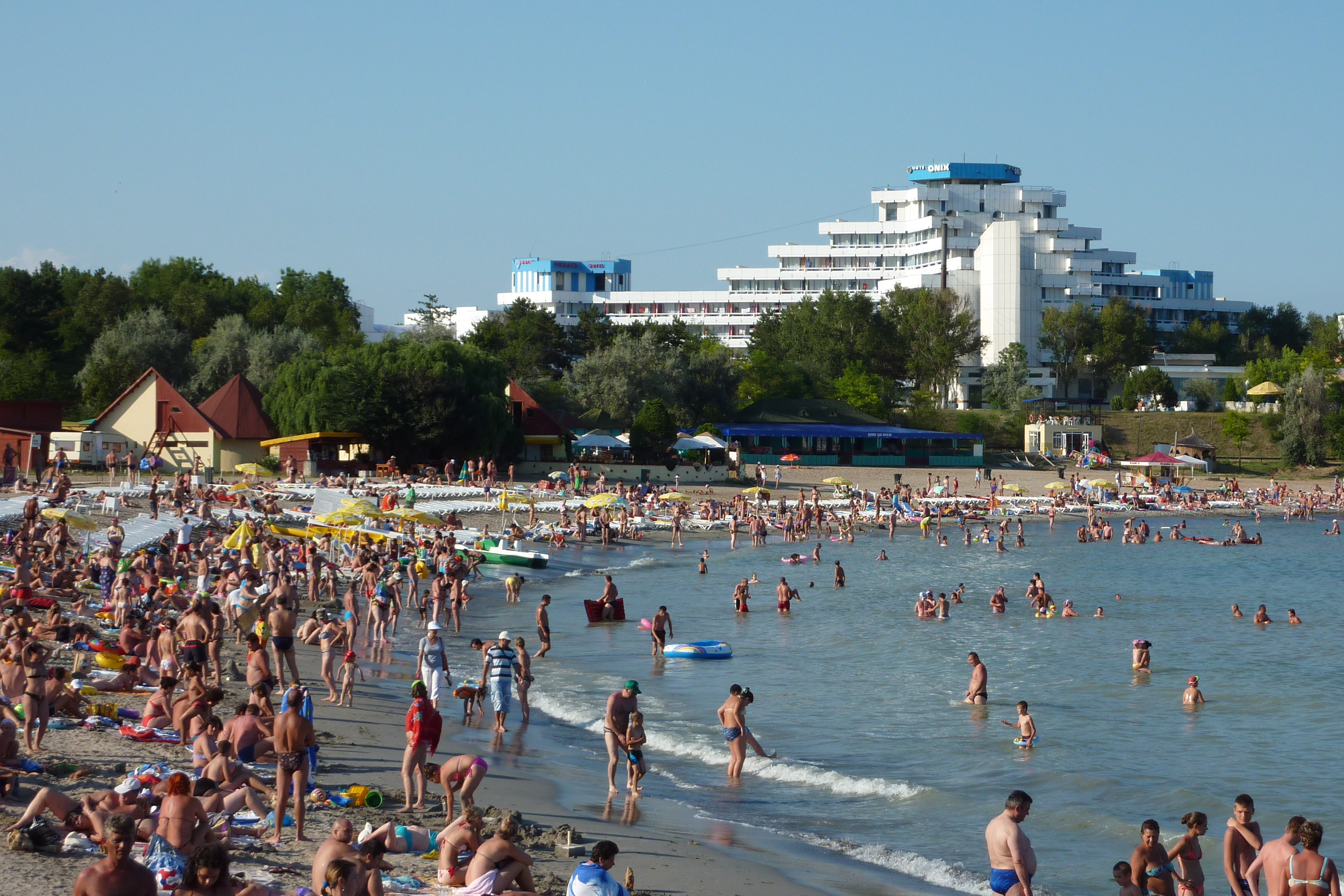
- The beach at Venus

- Location in Romania
- Coordinates: 43°50′42″N 28°35′44″E

Venus is a summer resort in Romania, on the Black Sea coast, 3 km (1.9 mi) north of Mangalia. It is part of a string of such resorts, Olimp, Neptun, Jupiter, and Cap Aurora.
