= Mihail Kogălniceanu International Airport =

Constanța "Mihail Kogălniceanu" International Airport Aeroportul Internaţional Constanța Mihail Kogălniceanu
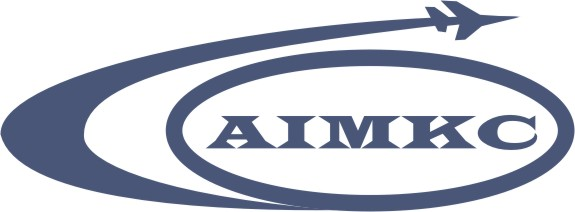

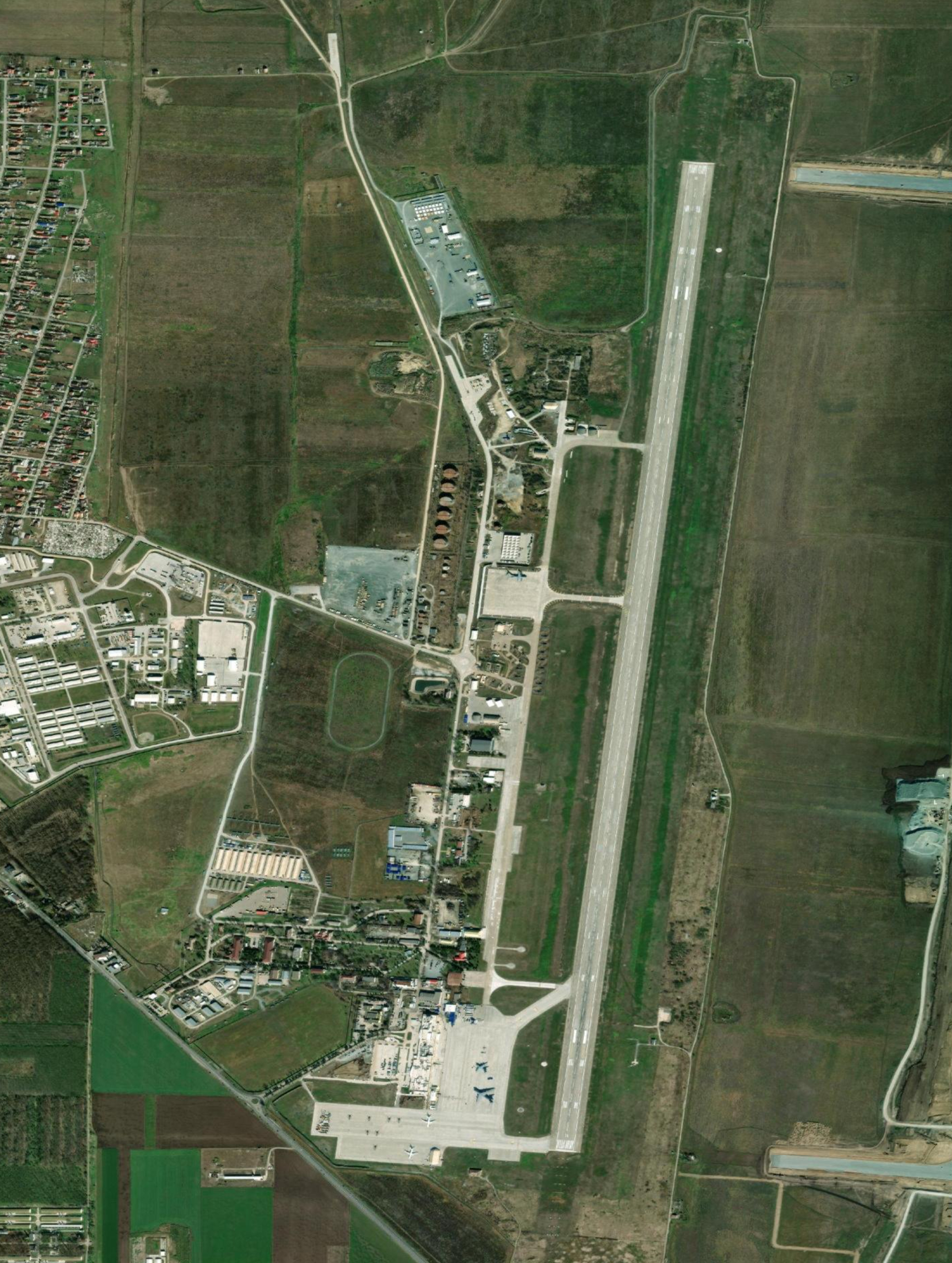
- IATA: CND; ICAO: LRCK

Summary
- Airport type: Public / Military
- Operator: S. N. Aeroportul International Mihail Kogalniceanu Constanța S.A.
- Serves: Constanța
- Location: Mihail Kogălniceanu, Romania
- Opened: May 1960
- Elevation AMSL: 353 ft (108 m)
- Coordinates: 44°21′44″N 028°29′18″E
- Website: www.mk-airport.ro

Map
- Location of airport in Romania

Runways
Direction	Length		Surface
Direction	m	ft	Surface
18/36	3,500	11,483	Concrete

Statistics (2025)
- Passengers: 119,426 ▲
- Aircraft movements: 6,506 ▲
- Source: AIP at the Romanian Airports Association (RAA)

Mihail Kogălniceanu Airport (IATA: CND, ICAO: LRCK) is situated in southeastern Romania, in the commune of Mihail Kogălniceanu, 26 kilometres (16 mi) north-northwest of Constanța. It is the main airport of the Northern Dobruja region and provides access to Constanța County, the Port of Constanța and the Black Sea resorts. The airport is named in honour of Mihail Kogălniceanu, the third Prime Minister of Romania.

The military sector of Mihail Kogălniceanu International Airport is currently home to the 57th Air Base. Since 1999 it has been used by the United States Air Force.

== History ==
Built in 1955 as a military airbase, Mihail Kogălniceanu Airport opened for civil operations in May 1960. It replaced the old Palas Airport (founded in 1932).

A passenger terminal with a capacity of 200 passengers per hour was inaugurated in 1962. In 1967 the terminal expanded to a processing capacity of 300 pax/hour. In 1974 a major expansion increased the processing capacity to 1,000 pax/hour.

Use of the airport peaked at 778,766 passengers in 1979, when foreign tourism to the Romanian Riviera was at a high. Mihail Kogălniceanu International Airport handled 127,635 passengers in 2017. That represented a 34.9% increase over the previous year.

In 2023, the airport registered a total traffic of 115,107 passengers, an increase by 44% compared to 2022 when 80,007 passengers were registered. The same year, work started on modernizing the airport and improving its infrastructure as part of a series of investments. The project includes work on the control tower, the passenger terminal as well as the development of other facilities.

== Airlines and destinations ==
The following airlines operate regular scheduled and charter flights at Constanța Airport:

Airlines	Destinations
Corendon Airlines	Seasonal charter: Antalya
Enter Air	Seasonal charter: Antalya (begins 1 June 2026), Heraklion (begins 16 June 2026)
Smartwings	Seasonal charter: Katowice
Turkish Airlines	Istanbul
Wizz Air	London–Luton, Rome–Fiumicino

== Statistics ==
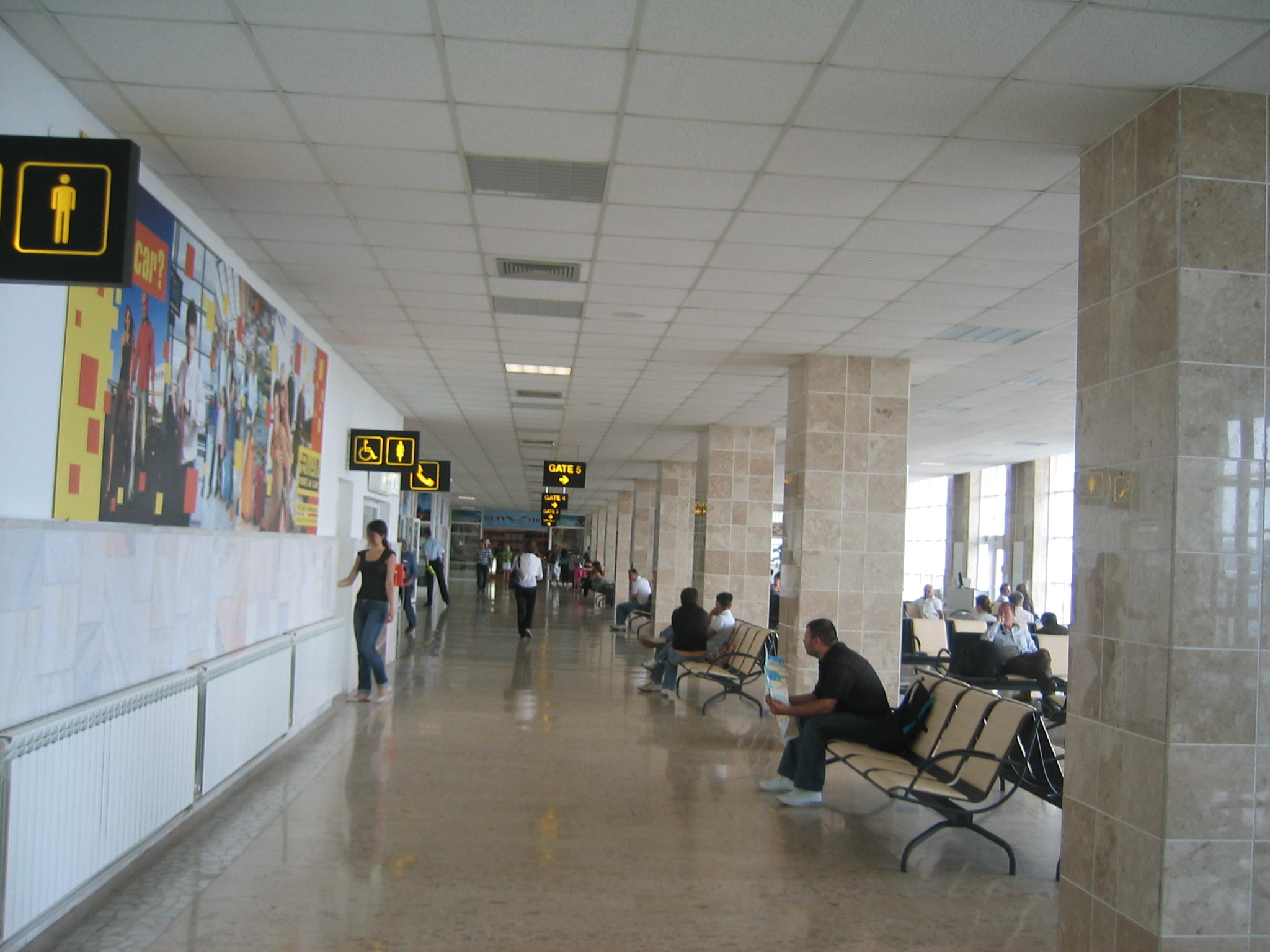
The departures terminal

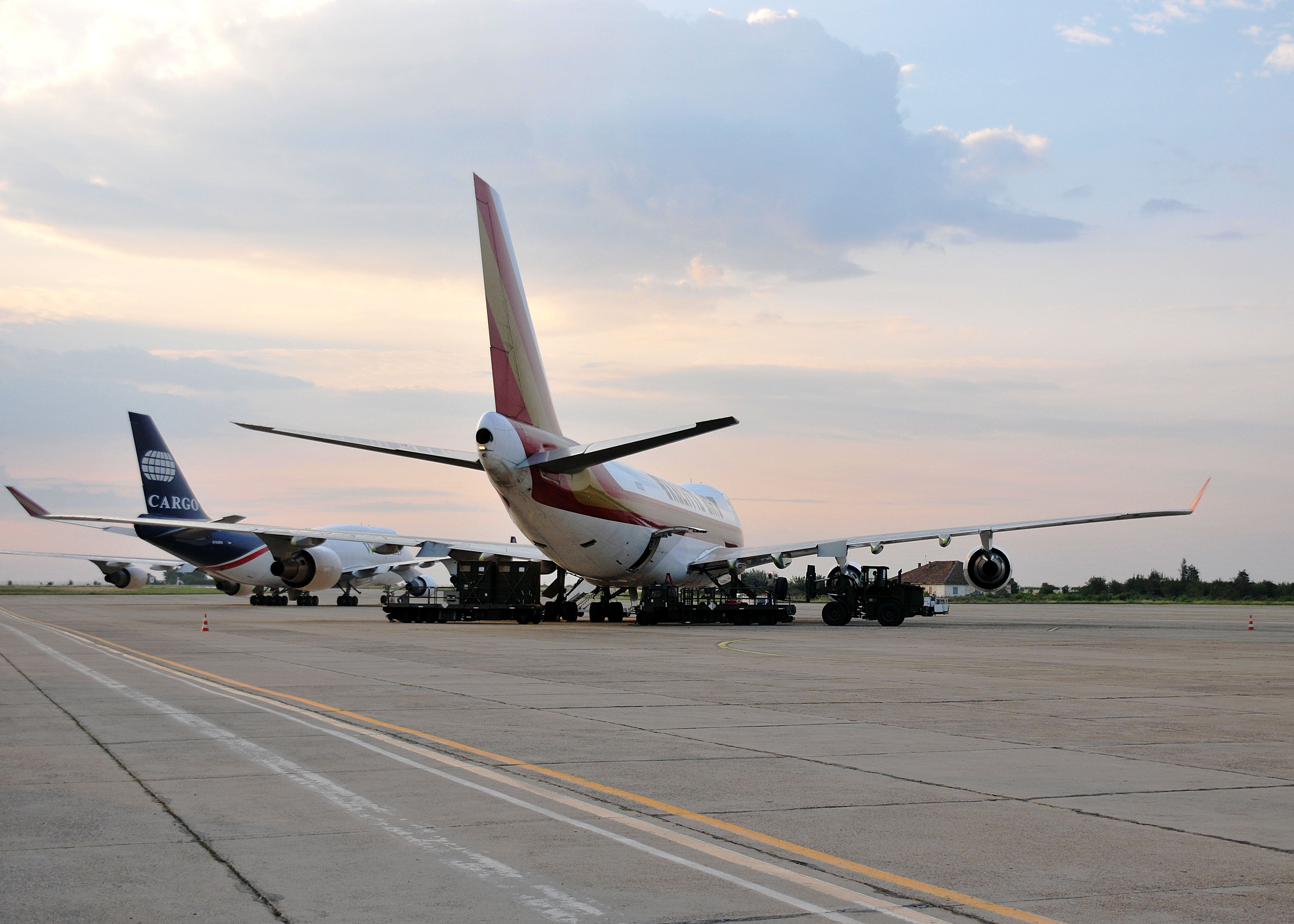
Two Boeing 747-400F cargo aircraft at the airport in 2013

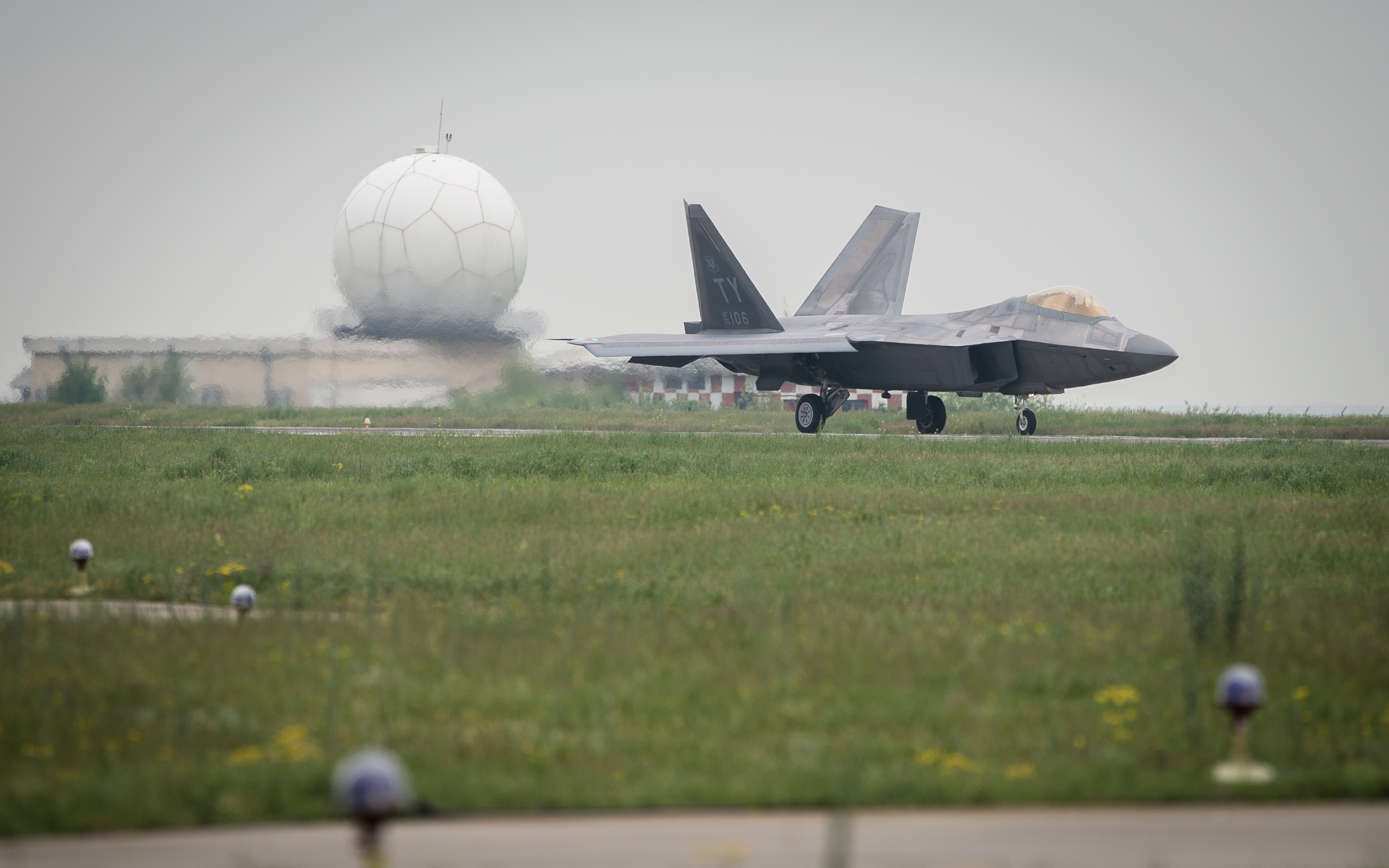
U.S. Air Force F-22A Raptor taxis on the flightline at Mihail Kogălniceanu Air Base

=== Traffic figures ===
Year	Passengers	Compared to Previous Year
2005	110,900	-
2006	71,236	▼35.7%
2007	42,331	▼40.5%
2008	60,477	▲42.8%
2009	68,690	▲13.5%
2010	74,587	▲8.5%
2011	73,713	▼0.1%
2012	94,641	▲28.4%
2013	73,301	▼22.5%
2014	37,939	▼48.2%
2015	63,329	▲66.9%
2016	94,594	▲49.4%
2017	127,635	▲34.9%
2018	129,235	▲1.3%
2019	127,302	▼1.5%
2020	42,891	▼66.3%
2021	52,465	▲22.3%
2022	80,007	▲52.5%
2023	115,107	▲43.9%
2024	109,371	▼5.0%
2025	119,426	▲9.2%

== Military usage ==
The airport is home of the Romanian Air Force 57th Air Base, which was the only unit operating the Mikoyan MiG-29 fighter aircraft. The base was disbanded in April 2004, then reestablished in 2018. It has been used by the US Military since 1999.

It is currently home to the 572nd Helicopter Squadron which operates IAR 330Ls. Currently, there are plans to further expand the base, transforming it into the biggest NATO airbase in Europe.

== Ground transportation ==
=== Bus ===
Several city bus lines link the airport to Constanța railway station. There are also a few private bus lines operating to downtown Constanța and to the Romanian Black Sea resorts. There is no shuttle service available.

=== Taxi ===
There are always cabs available outside the airport terminal. The cost of a ride to Constanța is around US$30 which is considerably higher than the bus fare for the same journey which costs as low as 3 lei/US$0.43.

=== Car ===
The Airport is easily accessible by car and is located in north-western part of Constanța, which can be accessed from the DN 2A/E60 Constanța-Hârșova or A4 motorway (Romania) until Ovidiu. The airport can also be reached from the A2 highway by exiting towards Cernavodă driving on DN22C towards Medgidia then through county road DJ 222 passing through Cuza Vodă all the way to the commune of Mihail Kogălniceanu where the airport is located.

Alternatively from the A2 highway there is another exit towards Medgidia on DJ381 and then continue on DJ222. Car rentals are also available. There is free short- and long-term parking right outside the airport terminal.

== Accidents and incidents ==
- On 7 December 1970, a BAC One-Eleven operated by TAROM crashed on approach to Mihail Kogălniceanu, 5 km (3.1 mi) away from the runway, killing 19 of the 27 occupants. The accident occurred due to poor weather. The aircraft was flying from Tel Aviv and had been diverted from Bucharest.
- On 12 June 2017, a MiG-21 LanceR of the Romanian Air Force crashed on approach, 8 km away from Mihail Kogălniceanu Airport. The pilot, though seriously injured, survived and the aircraft was written off.

== See also ==
- Aviation in Romania
- Transport in Romania
