= Callatis Festival =

Music and culture festival in Romania

Callatis Festival is the largest music and culture festival held in Romania.

== Location ==
The festival is held on a barge that is docked at Mangalia Marina. The barge consists of a huge stage and a very large backstage area, enough to hold over 200 people. The spectators sit on stairs across the harbor, about 20 m (66 ft) away from the stage.

== History ==
The Callatis Festival began in 1999 and has expanded ever since.

== Dates ==
The Callatis Festival is held every summer between 8 and 15 August. The main part of the festival (the concerts on the stage) takes begins at 21:00 and ends after midnight. This part of the festival is aired live on TVR 2 and TVR International.

== Hosts ==
From 1999 to 2003, the hosts of the Callatis Festival changed every year. Since 2004, the organizers have opted for continuity, so the permanent festival hosts are Gabriel Cotabiță and Sorana Belciu. Callatis Club, the after-show of the festival, was hosted in 2006 by Cătălin Măruță. In 2006, Sorana Belciu was replaced by two young presenters selected in the Miss Diaspora contest. After a year's break, Callatis Club returned to Romanian Television in 2008, presented by Leonard Miron.

== Schedule ==
Every year the Callatis Festival has themed nights. There is Europa Top Hit night where all the major Romanian music stars gather, folk music night, and Miss Diaspora night where Romanian girls living in foreign countries compete with each other in a beauty contest.

== Foreign artists ==
Al Bano came to the festival in 2003 and Panjabi MC in 2004. In 2005, the big foreign star at the festival was In-Grid, the Italian chanteuse and, in 2006, Vaya con Dios performed at the festival. Their show was viewed by about 40,000 people on location, and more than a million live on TV. The band brought 600 pounds of equipment for the 20 songs they performed on stage.

== Scandals ==
In 2005, Europa FM was criticised by Callatis Club show host Cătălin Măruță because of the radio station's motto: "A radio for millions of people". He stated that this motto did not actually reflect the station's target.

In 2006, singer Cream started an argument with host Gabriel Cotabiță because she was on the festival's program but did not actually appear on stage. Maria Dragomiroiu, Mihai Trăistariu, Simplu and Morandi have publicly expressed their disgust regarding the fact that they performed live on stage but their show was not aired on TV due to a mid-show commercial break. Allegedly, they had not been told that their performance would not be aired on TV.
