= Cătălin Măruță =

Romanian television host

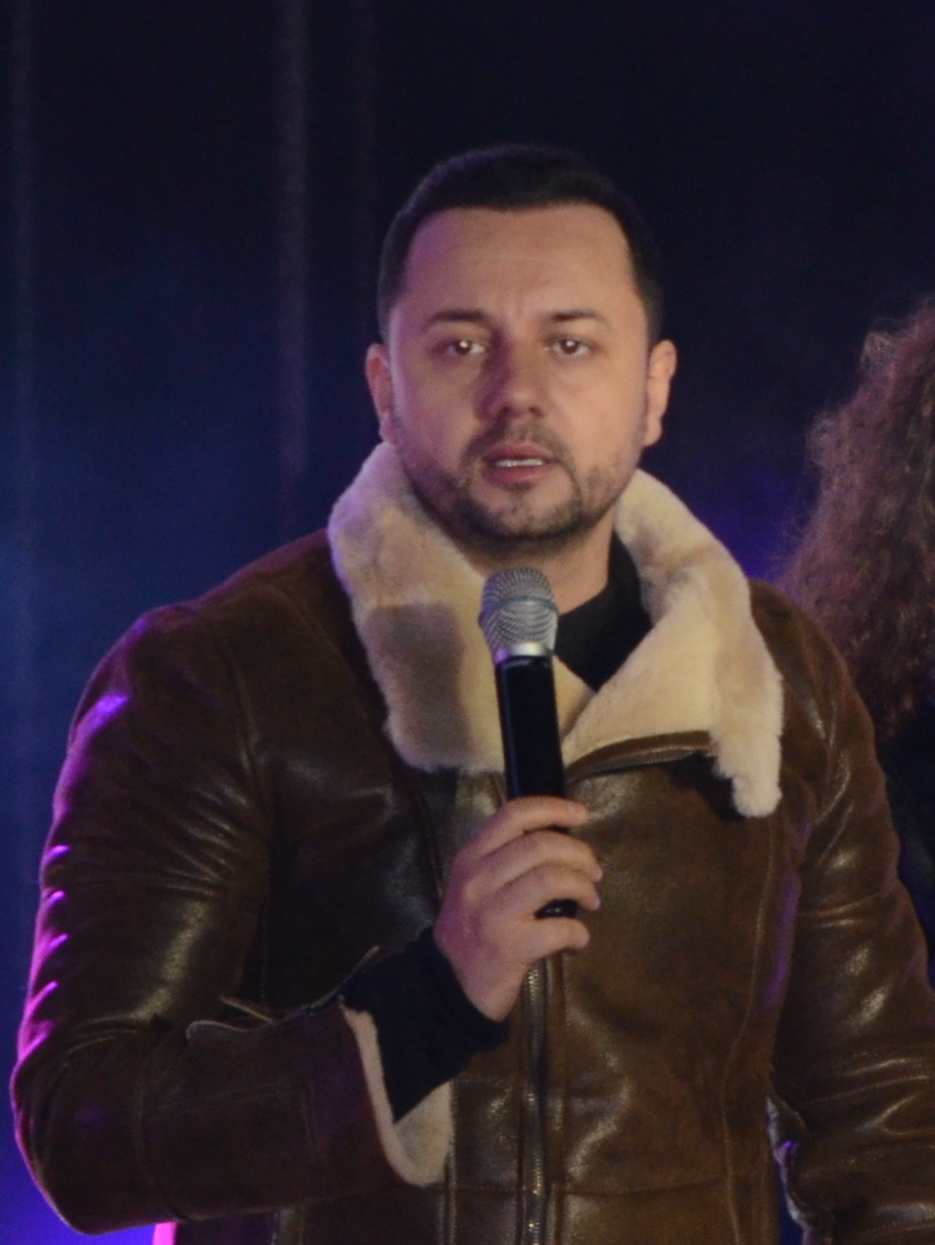
- Măruță in December 2015
- Born: Cătălin Constantin Măruță; 27 January 1978 (age 48); Târgu Jiu, Romania
- Education: Nicolae Titulescu University
- Occupations: Influencer, ex. TV Host
- Years active: 2001–present
- Television: Tonomatul DP2, La Măruță
- Spouse: Andra (m. 2008)
- Children: 2

Cătălin Constantin Măruță (born 27 January 1978) is a Romanian television host.

== Career ==
From 2002 to 2005, he was presented the host TV of the Tonomatul DP2 show officially on TVR 2. In 2005, he worked for Realitatea TV, where he presented another morning show called Trezeşte-te la realitate cu Cătălin Măruță (lit. 'Wake up to reality with Cătălin Măruță'). Alongside singer Luminița Anghel, he presented the Romanian National Eurovision Selection in 2006. He returned to hosting the Callatis Club show during the Callatis Festival in August 2006. From October 22 2007 to February 6 2026, he presented the host TV of the Happy Hour/La Măruță show officially on Pro TV.

Măruță voiced a goose character in the Romanian dub of Kung Fu Panda 3.

== Personal life ==
Since August 23, 2008 he has been married to the Romanian singer Andra. On March 16, 2011, the two became parents when Andra gave birth to a boy named David. In July 2015, Andra gave birth to her second child, a baby girl named Eva Maria Ioana.
