= Jupiter, Romania =

Jupiter
- Beach
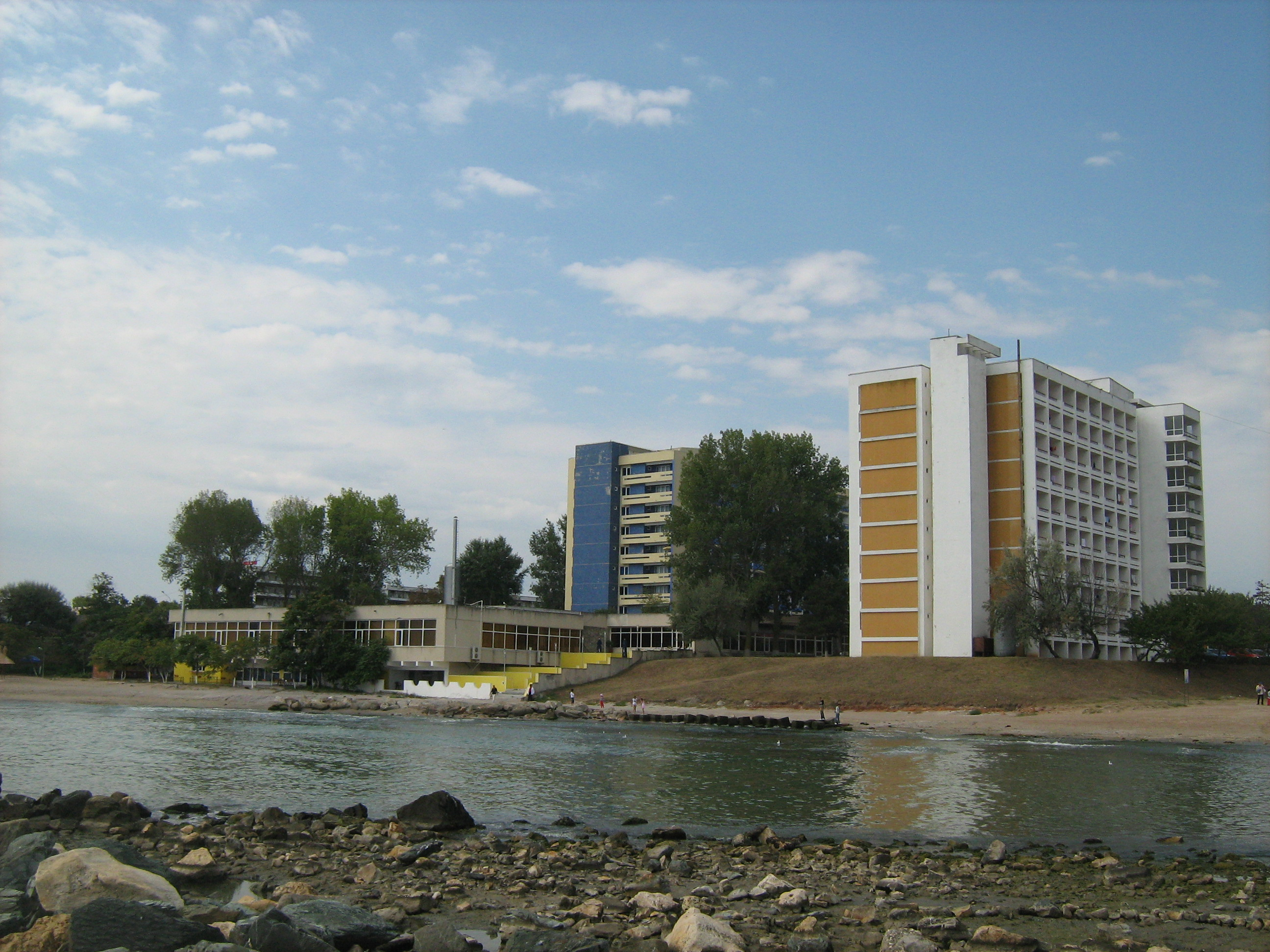
- The beach at Jupiter

- Location in Romania
- Coordinates: 43°51′10″N 28°36′25″E

Jupiter is a beach and summer resort on the Romanian seacoast, on the Black Sea, 4 km (2.5 mi) north of Mangalia. It is part of a string of such resorts, Olimp, Neptun, Cap Aurora, and Venus.
