= Gabriel Cotabiță =

Romanian musician (1955–2024)

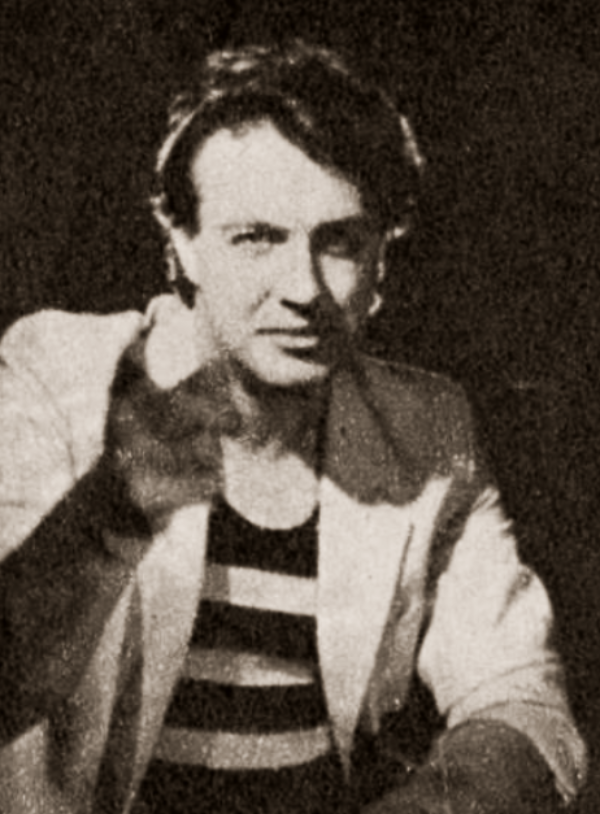
- Cotabiță in 1988

Background information
- Born: Gabriel Cotabiță; 1 November 1955; Craiova, Romania
- Died: 23 November 2024 (aged 69) Bucharest, Romania
- Genres: Pop; rock; pop rock
- Occupations: Singer, musician; producer; television presenter
- Years active: 1974–2024
- Labels: Electrecord; Romagram; Roton; MAR Music Production; Nova Music; OVO Music; Cat Music

Gabriel Cotabiță (1 November 1955 – 23 November 2024) was a Romanian pop and rock singer.

== Life and career ==
Cotabiță was born on 1 November 1955. He graduated from the Craiova's Institute of Electrotechnics, becoming an engineer.

Cotabiță debuted in rock music in 1975 with the group Redivivus. In the 1980s, he was a member of the well-known rock group Holograf. In 2002 he joined a group of rock then musicians and together they formed the band VH2, of which Gabriel was a vocalist.

He was also a host of a Callatis Festival and also a prominent part of a Romanian mainstream rock scene. He had a few notable collaborations with artists such as Ștefan Bănică, Jr. and Loredana Groza.

Cotabiță died from a stroke on 23 November 2024, aged 69.

== Selected discography ==
- 1988 – Noapte albastră
- 1989 – Noi rămânem oameni
- 1991 – Prima iubire și ultima
- 1993 – Prizonier
- 2010 – Fărâme de tandrețe
