= Mangalia Marina =

Harbour in Mangalia, Romania

- Tourist Harbour
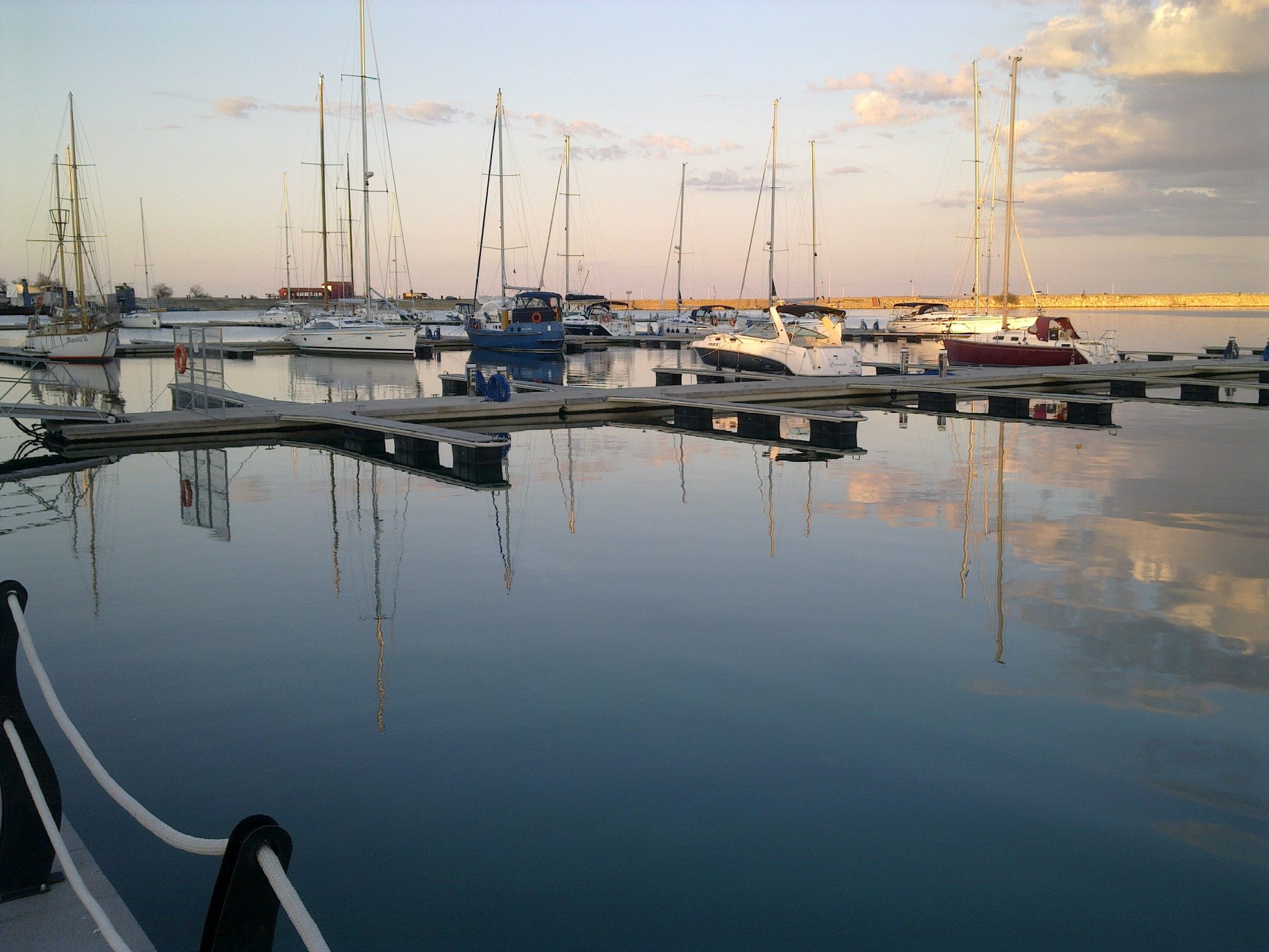

- Location of Mangalia Marina
- Coordinates: 43°48′28.21″N 28°34′59.9664″E
- Country: Romania
- County: Constanţa County
- City: Mangalia
- Time zone: UTC+2 (EET)
  - Summer (DST): UTC+3 (EEST)
- Website: https://marina.mangalia.ro

Mangalia Marina is a harbour for yachts and small boats located in Mangalia, Romania on the Black Sea. It is the most modern tourist harbour in Romania and sits on the Port of Mangalia.

== Overview ==
Mangalia Marina was built between 2006 and 2008 with the help of a joint grant of 4,071,365.77 euros from the European Union and a City Council and City Hall of Mangalia contribution of 651,418.52 euro. The marina is a one-day sailing distance to the Port of Varna in Bulgaria, a two-day trip from the Port of Odessa in Ukraine, and a few hours from the Port of Constanţa and the Danube Delta. Conditions are ideal for mooring and vessel maintenance, and can accommodate 146 moored vessels. Larger boats can follow coastal shipping routes along the Istanbul-Varna-Mangalia-Odessa-Yalta perimeter.

Together with the Varna Marina from Bulgaria, the Mangalia Marina co-hosts the BMW Black Sea International Regatta, which is organized annually by Romania Yacht Club, Bulgaria LZ Yachting 1991 and Odessa International Yacht Club.

== Gallery ==
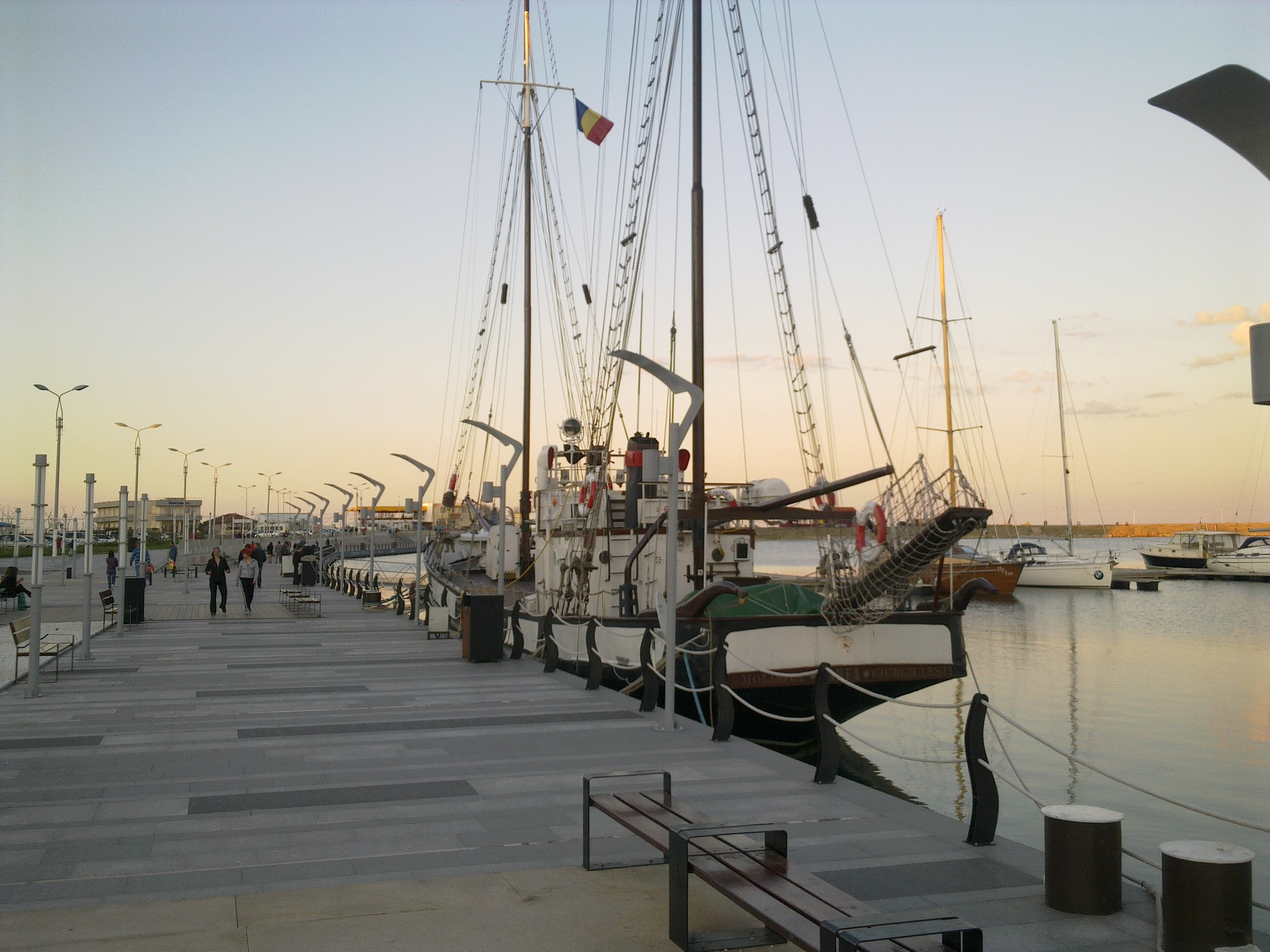

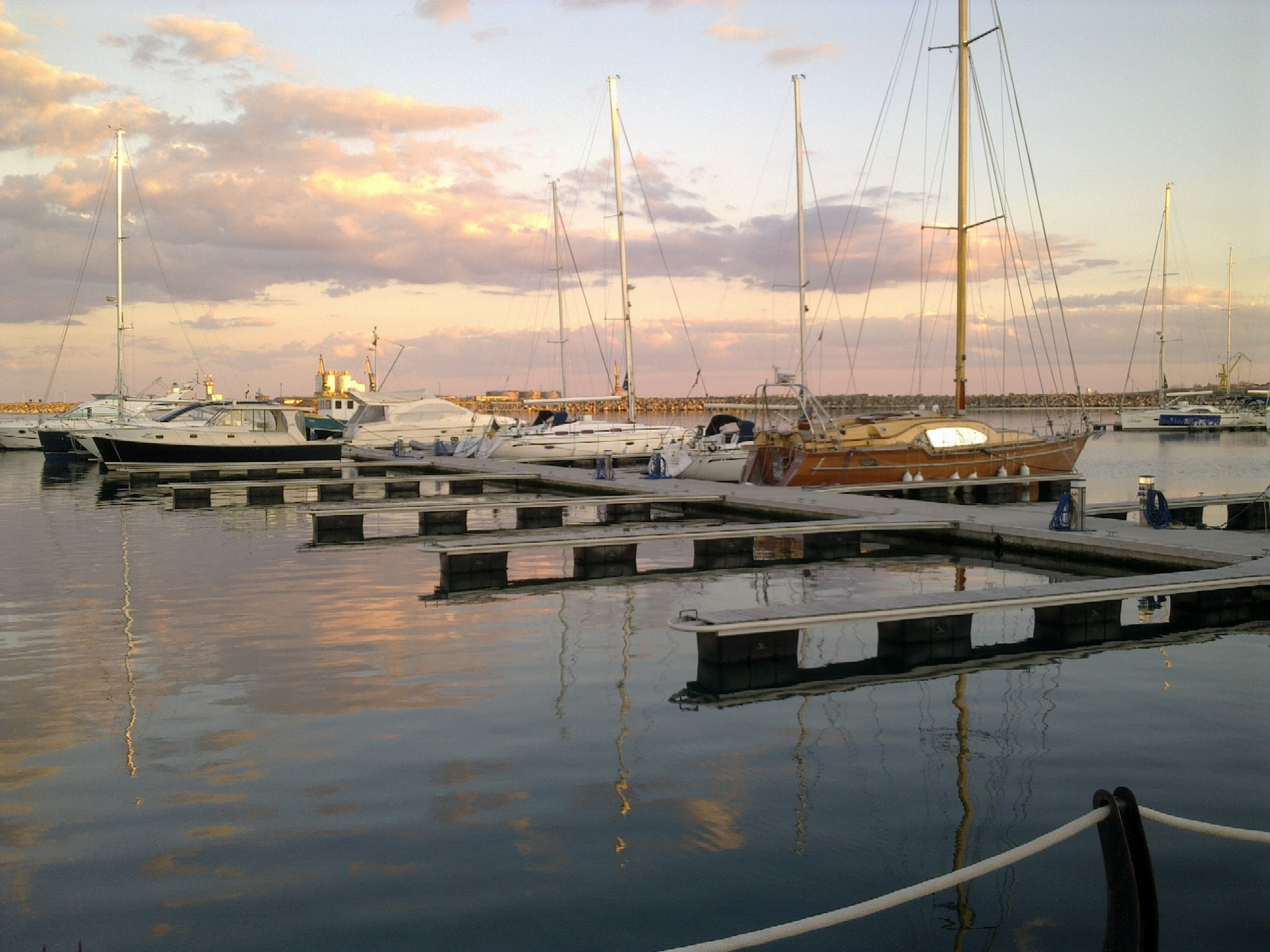

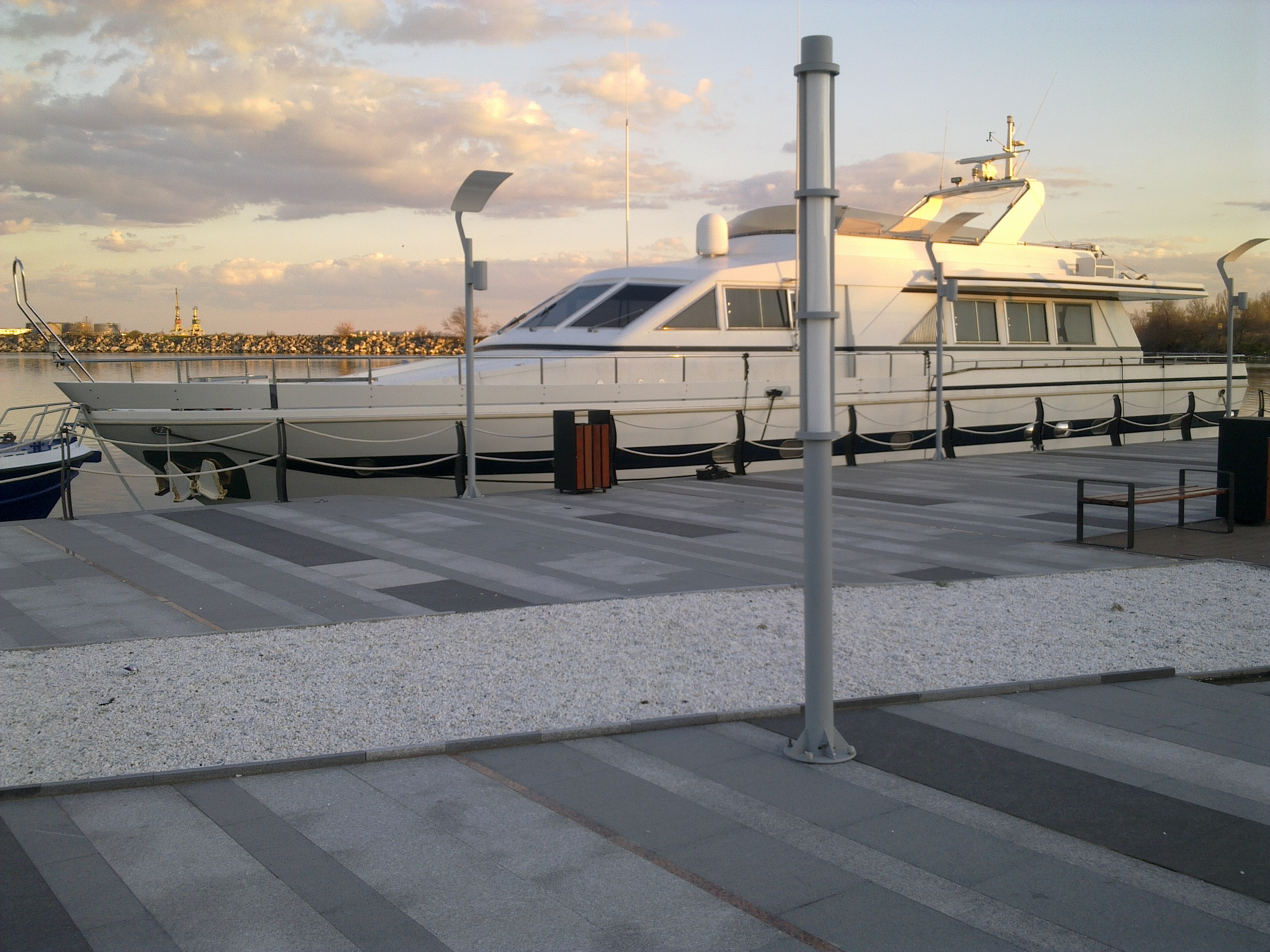

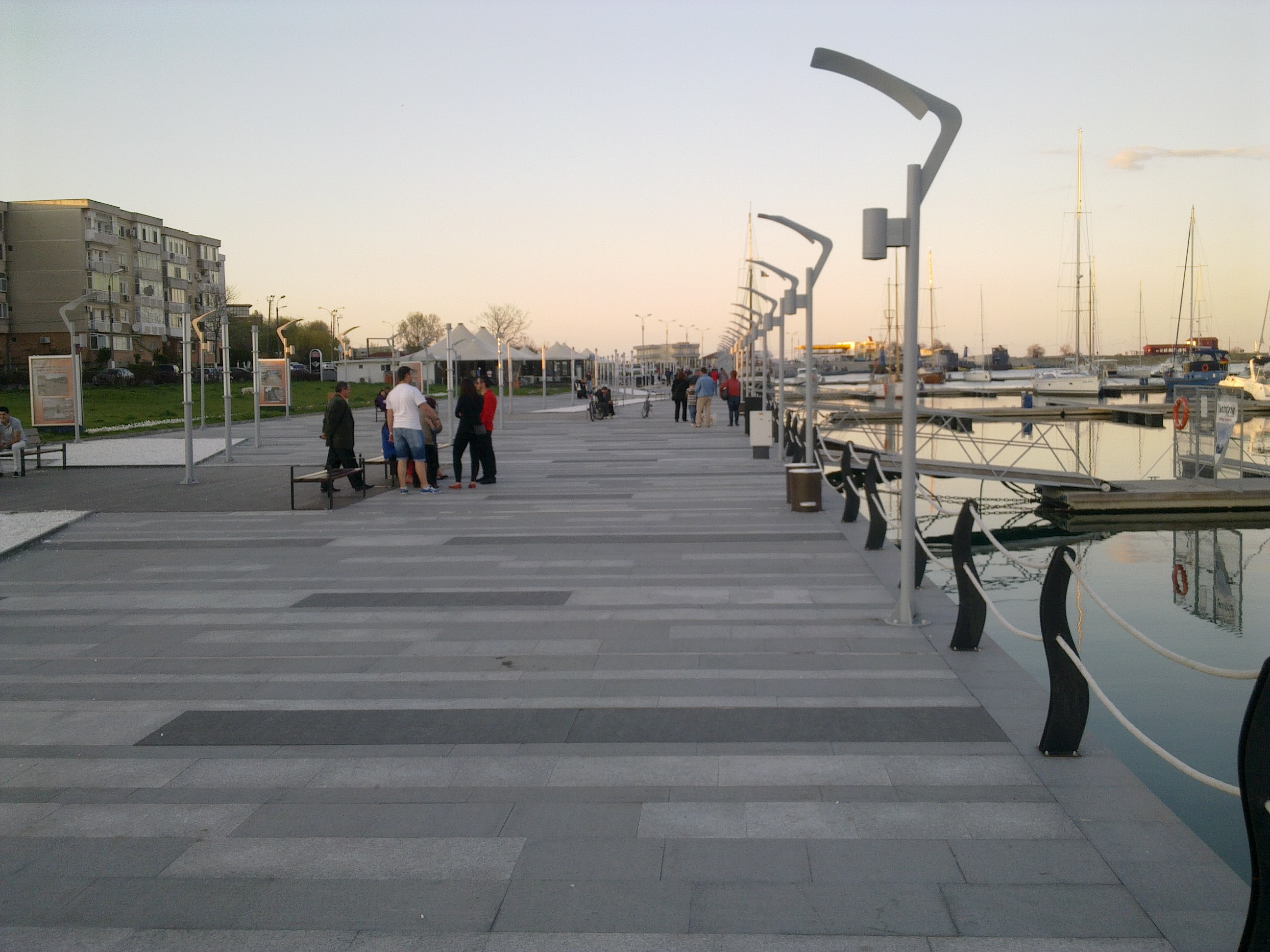

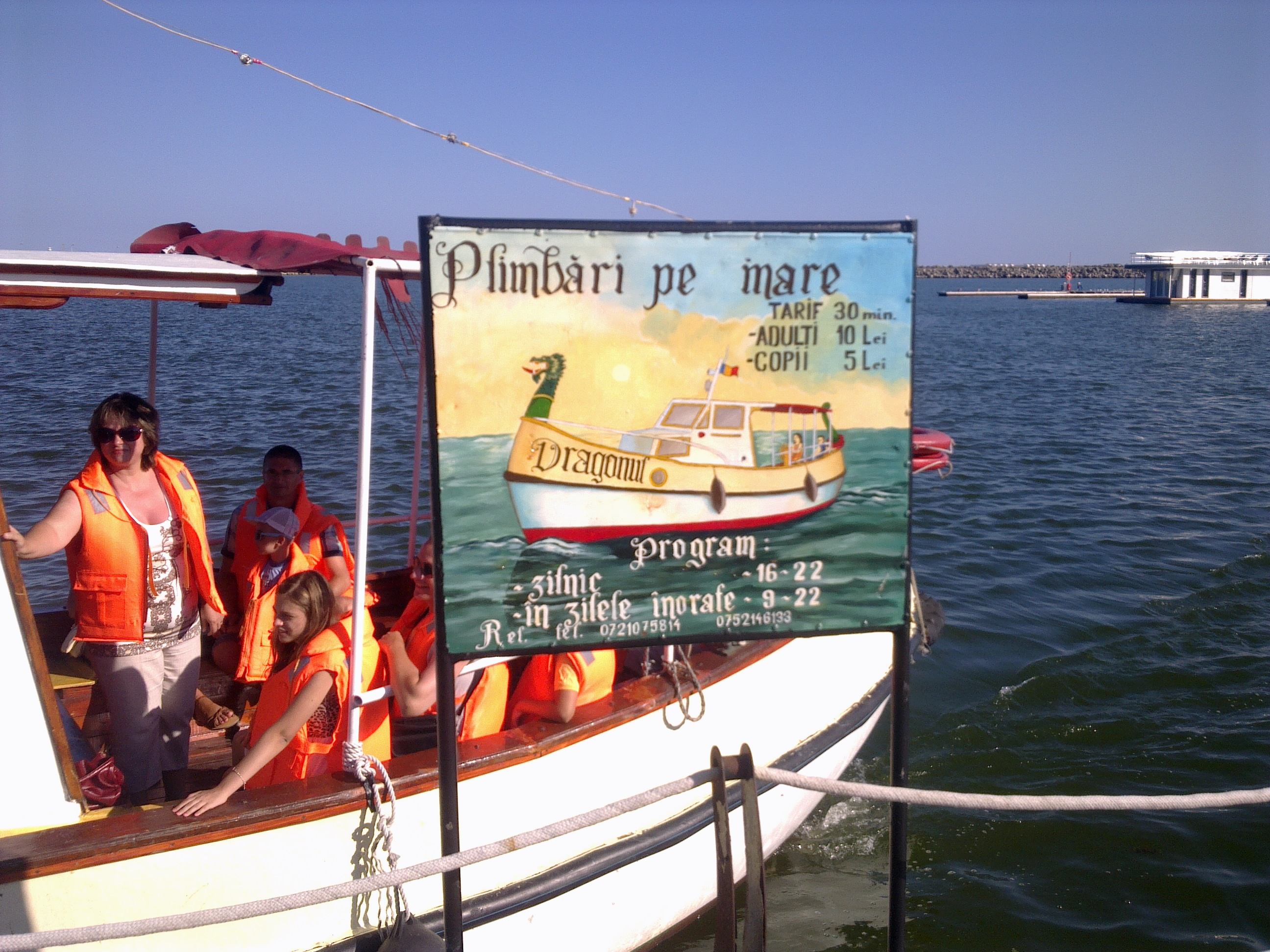
