= Mangalia =

- Municipality
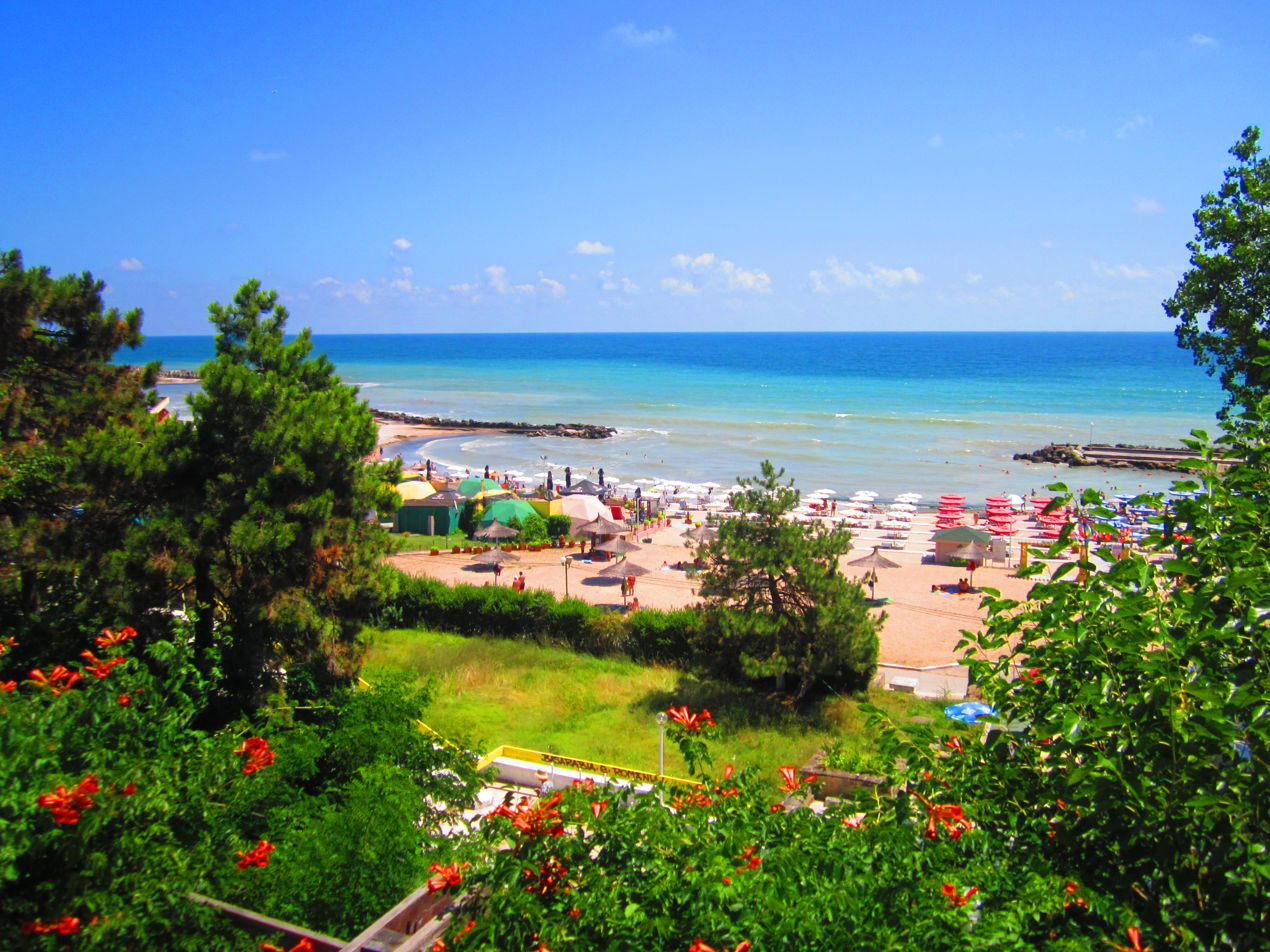
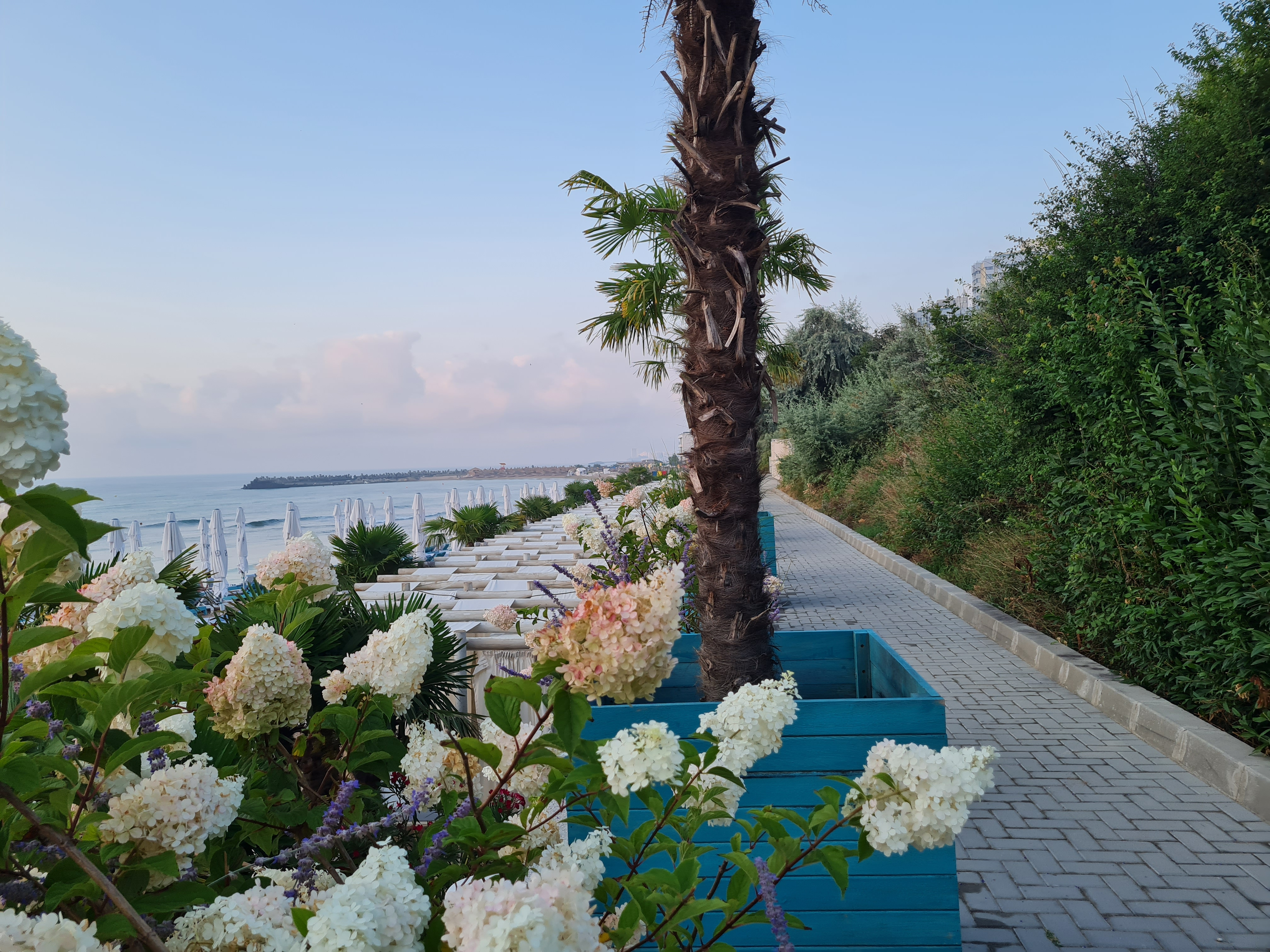
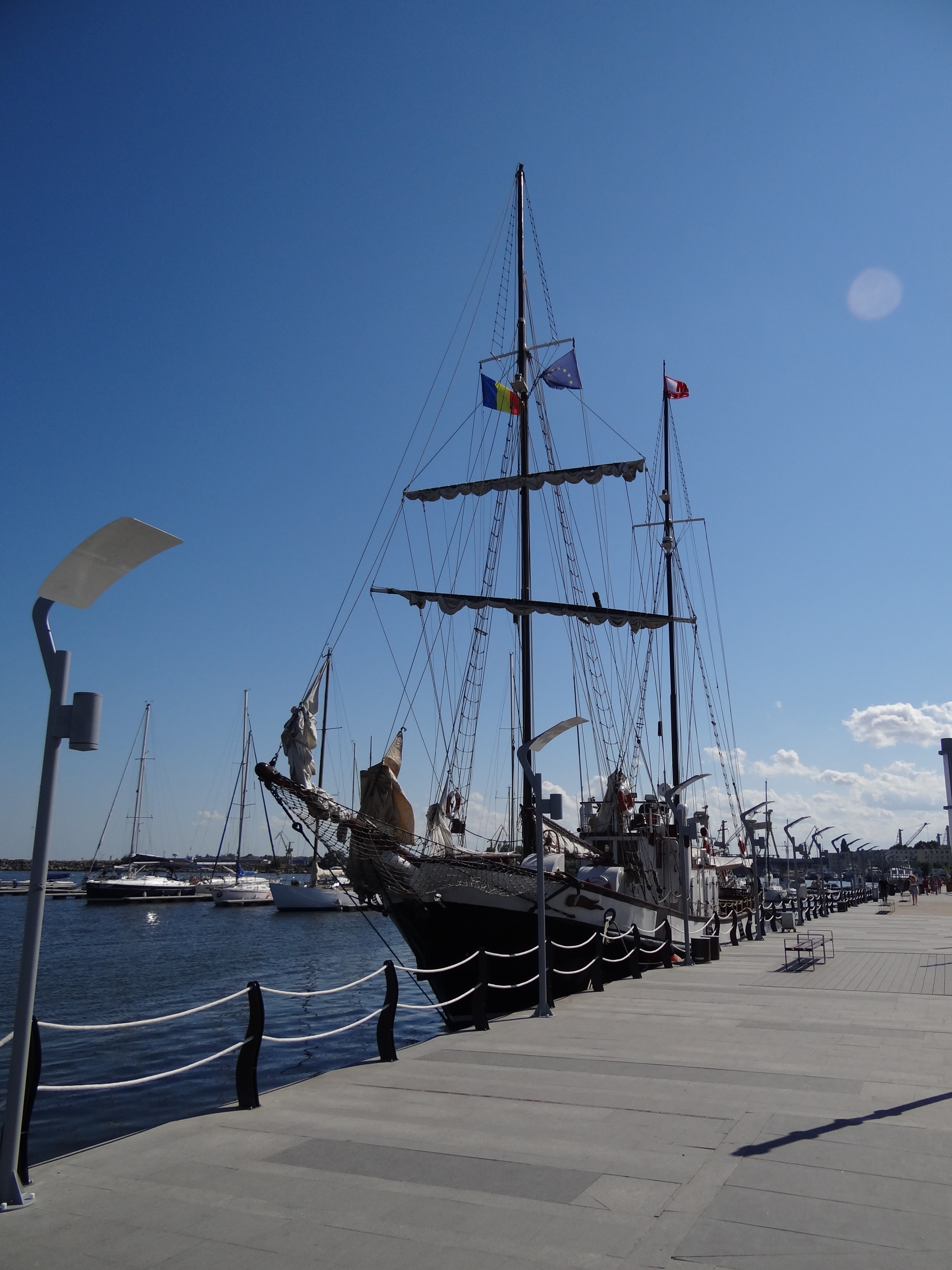
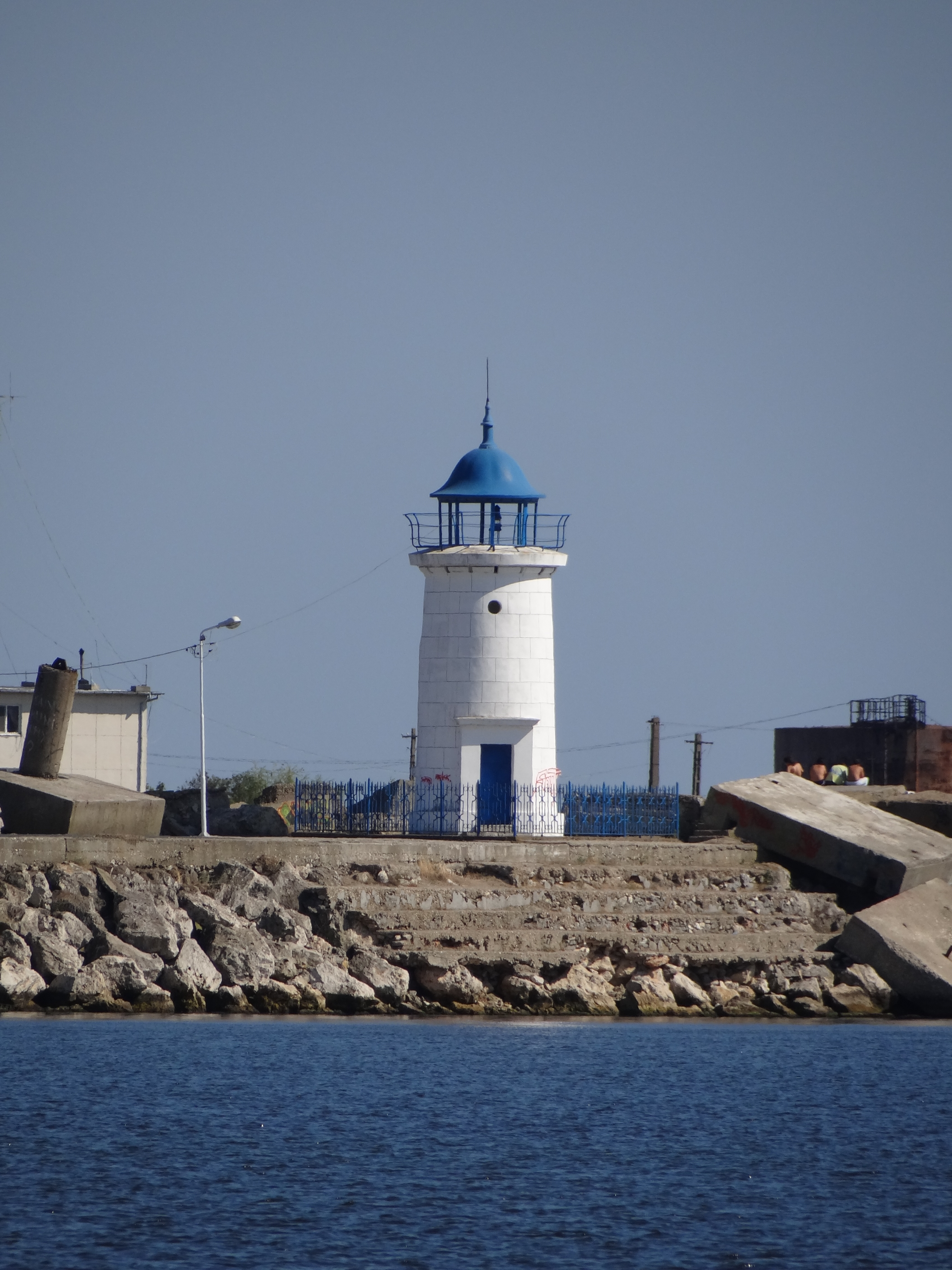
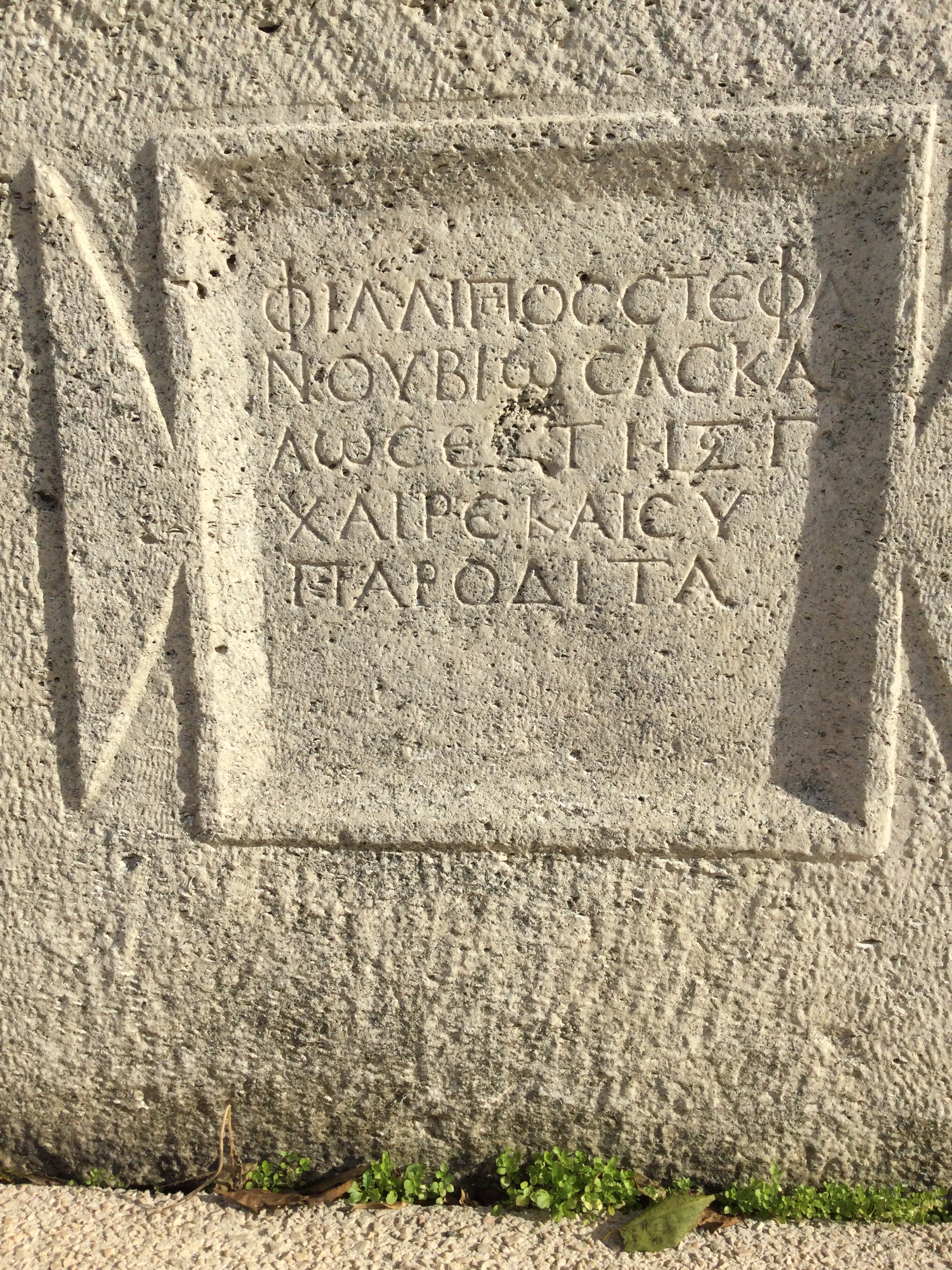
- From top, left to right: Olimp beach; Mangalia port; Historic Lighthouse; Ruins of the ancient city of Callatis

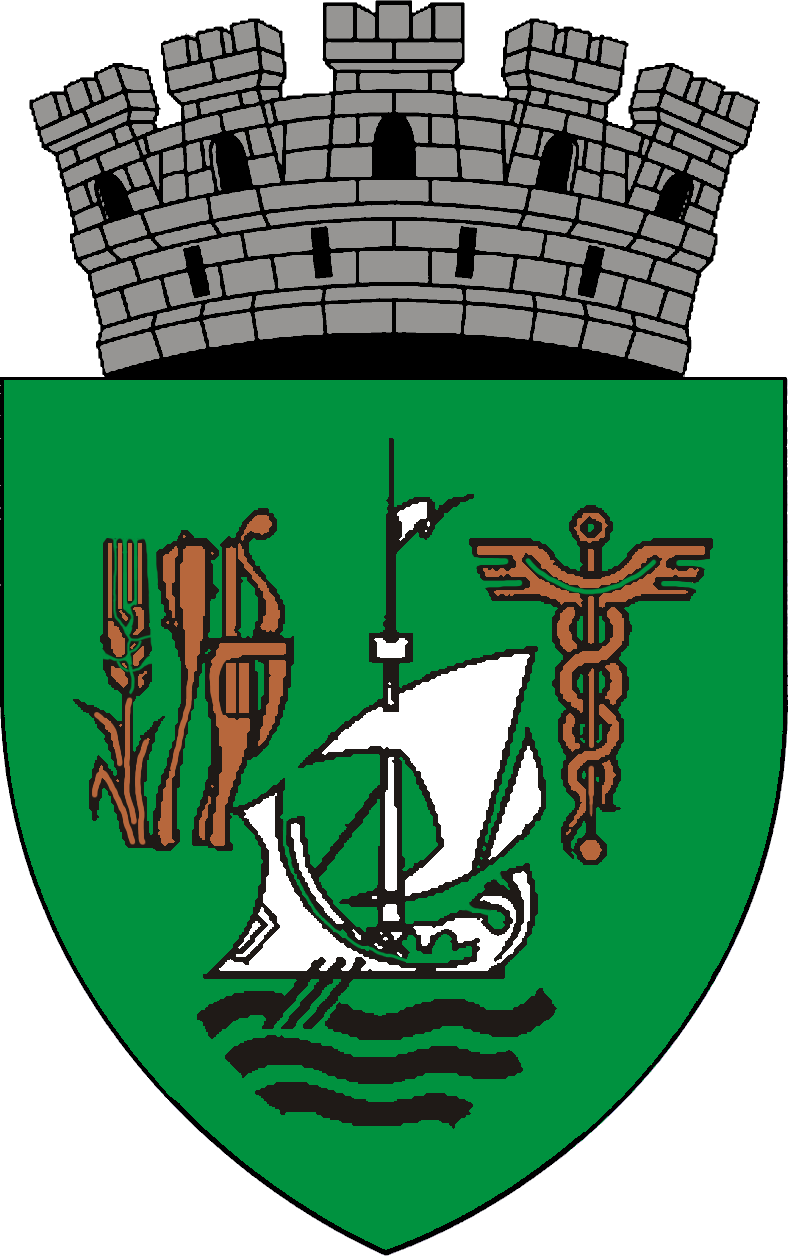
- Coat of arms

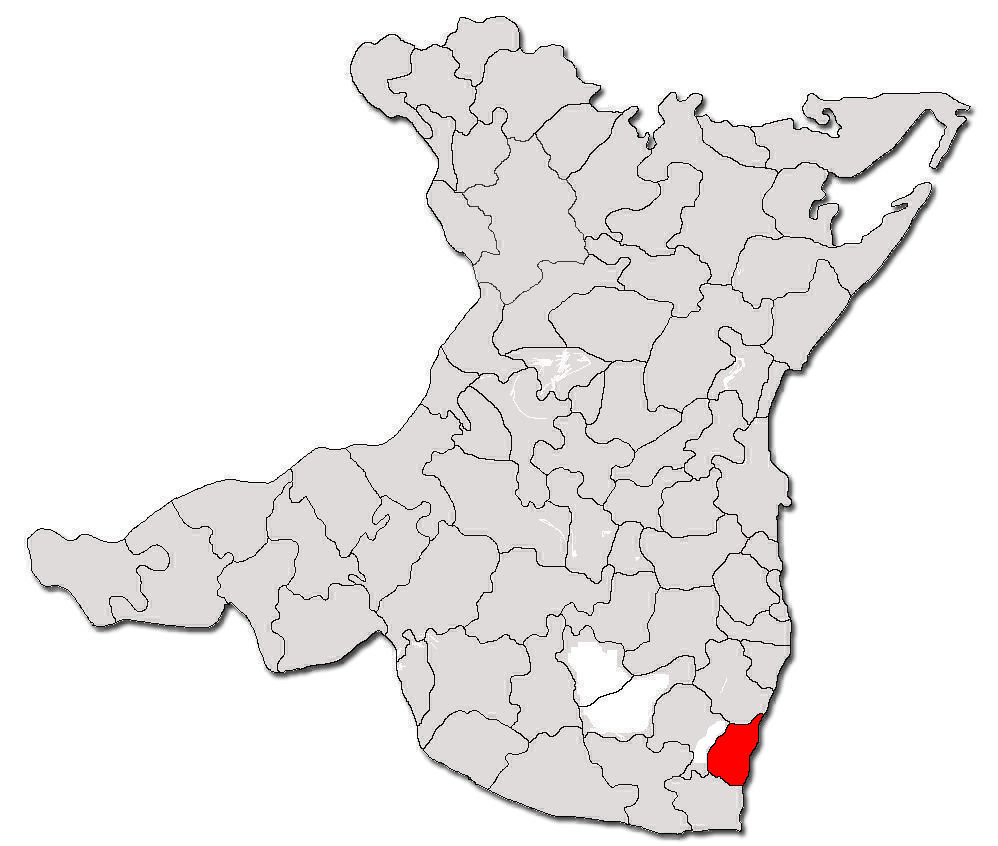
- Location in Constanța County

- Location in Romania
- Coordinates: 43°49′02″N 28°34′58″E
- Country: Romania
- County: Constanța

Government
  - Mayor (2024–2028): Cristian Radu (PNL)
- Area: 62.26 km^{2} (24.04 sq mi)
- Elevation: 20 m (66 ft)
- Population (2021-12-01): 31,950
  - Density: 513.2/km^{2} (1,329/sq mi)
- Time zone: UTC+02:00 (EET)
  - Summer (DST): UTC+03:00 (EEST)
- Postal code: 905500
- Area code: (+40) 0241
- Vehicle reg.: CT
- Website: mangalia.ro

Mangalia (Romanian pronunciation: [maŋˈɡali.a], Turkish: Mankalya), ancient Callatis (Greek: Κάλλατις/Καλλατίς; other historical names: Pangalia, Panglicara, Tomisovara), is a city and a port on the coast of the Black Sea in southeastern Constanța County, Northern Dobruja, Romania.

The municipality of Mangalia also administers several summertime seaside resorts: Cap Aurora, Jupiter, Neptun, Olimp, Saturn, and Venus.

== History ==
The Greek colony of Callatis was founded in the 6th century BC by the city of Heraclea Pontica. Like the other Greek cities on the coast nearby, it became a Greek city-state with its own chora (hinterland) which included the fortified settlement of Albesti 15 km distant. Its first silver coinage was minted around 350 BC.

The Macedonians invaded the area starting in 339 BC, against which Callatis and the nearby Greek cities revolted, leading to the siege of the city in 313–311 by Lysimachus and its reoccupation.

In 72 BC, Callatis was conquered by the Roman general Lucullus and was assigned to the Roman province of Moesia Inferior. Throughout the 2nd century AD, the city built defensive fortifications and the minting of coinage under the Roman emperors Septimius Severus and Caracalla continued. Callatis suffered multiple invasions in the 3rd century but recovered in the 4th century to regain its status as an important trade hub and port city. From the 7th to the 11th century, the city was under the rule of the First Bulgarian Empire.

Callatis existed until the mid-7th century under this name. Life in the town resumed in the 10th century. In the 13th century, Callatis came to be known as Pangalia. The Vlachs called it Tomisovara and the Greeks called it Panglicara. By the 16th century, the town had acquired its present name, Mangalia.

Between March and July 1878, the city of Mangalia was part of Bulgaria according to the Treaty of San Stefano. In July 1878 the Congress of Berlin modified the Treaty of San Stefano. According to Article XLVI the Bulgaria–Romania border in Dobrudja was defined as "a line starting from the east of Silistra and terminating on the Black Sea, south of Mangalia."

=== Sights ===
A Roman Byzantine building has been excavated against the city wall and next to a street paved with big limestone tiles and which has a channel on its longitudinal axis. It is composed of an atrium with a complex system for collecting rainwater, a palace composed of monumental halls with columns and a basilica. It was probably a bishop's palace.

== Geography and climate ==
Mangalia is positioned at 43°49′ latitude and 28°35′ longitude, with an approximate elevation of 10 meters, 44 kilometres (27 miles) south of the municipality of Constanţa, at the same latitude as the French resort of Nice. Mangalia is one of the southernmost resorts on the Romanian coast of the Black Sea.

Mangalia is characterized by a moderate maritime climate (annual average temperature 11 °C (52 °F) - one of the highest in Romania) with hot summers (July average over 21 °C (70 °F)) and mild winters (January average 1 °C (34 °F)), Mangalia being the country's second place, after Băile Herculane, with positive average temperatures in wintertime. Spring comes early but is cool and autumn is long and warm. In summer, cloudiness is reduced (about 25 sunny days in a month) and the duration of sunshine is of 10–12 hours a day, with over 2300 hours yearly. Annual precipitation is low (about 400 mm (16 in)).

The sea breeze is stronger in summer. The natural cure factors are the water of the Black Sea, which is chlorided, sulphated, sodic, magnesian, hypotonic (mineralization 15.5g), the sulphurous, chlorided, bicarbonated, sodic, calcic, mesothermal (21-28 °C) mineral waters of the springs in the northern part of the city, in the area of the beach between Saturn and Venus, the sulphurous peat mud, rich in minerals, which is extracted from the peat bog north of the city (expected to last another 250 years) and the marine climate, rich in saline aerosols and solar radiation that have a bracing effect on the organism.

The resort has a large, fine-sand beach developed for purposes of aeroheliotherapy and wave therapy, as well as high seawalls with a specific microclimate where one may benefit from inhalations of saline aerosols having therapeutic effects.

Climate data for Mangalia (2014–2026 normals, extremes 1965–present, sun 1965–2000)
Month	Jan	Feb	Mar	Apr	May	Jun	Jul	Aug	Sep	Oct	Nov	Dec	Year
Record high °C (°F)	19.2 (66.6)	26.0 (78.8)	29.8 (85.6)	33.4 (92.1)	37.0 (98.6)	36.5 (97.7)	39.5 (103.1)	34.8 (94.6)	35.1 (95.2)	31.4 (88.5)	26.7 (80.1)	21.1 (70.0)	39.5 (103.1)
Mean daily maximum °C (°F)	6.2 (43.2)	7.7 (45.9)	10.2 (50.4)	14.1 (57.4)	19.2 (66.6)	24.6 (76.3)	27.1 (80.8)	27.2 (81.0)	23.6 (74.5)	17.7 (63.9)	13.1 (55.6)	8.6 (47.5)	16.6 (61.9)
Daily mean °C (°F)	3.2 (37.8)	4.7 (40.5)	7.1 (44.8)	10.8 (51.4)	15.9 (60.6)	21.0 (69.8)	23.3 (73.9)	23.7 (74.7)	20.1 (68.2)	14.4 (57.9)	10.0 (50.0)	5.6 (42.1)	13.3 (56.0)
Mean daily minimum °C (°F)	0.3 (32.5)	1.8 (35.2)	3.9 (39.0)	7.5 (45.5)	12.5 (54.5)	17.4 (63.3)	19.5 (67.1)	20.1 (68.2)	16.5 (61.7)	11.2 (52.2)	7.0 (44.6)	2.7 (36.9)	10.0 (50.1)
Record low °C (°F)	−25.2 (−13.4)	−18.5 (−1.3)	−12.6 (9.3)	−1.8 (28.8)	−2.9 (26.8)	8.8 (47.8)	8.4 (47.1)	9.2 (48.6)	1.4 (34.5)	−3.4 (25.9)	−8.4 (16.9)	−15.7 (3.7)	−25.2 (−13.4)
Average precipitation mm (inches)	39.2 (1.54)	30.6 (1.20)	26.6 (1.05)	37.2 (1.46)	34.2 (1.35)	36.1 (1.42)	31.9 (1.26)	49.7 (1.96)	35.6 (1.40)	46.1 (1.81)	45.5 (1.79)	35.5 (1.40)	448.2 (17.64)
Average precipitation days (≥ 1.0 mm)	5.8	5.4	5.5	5.6	5.1	3.9	3.9	2.2	3.1	4.4	6.2	5.8	56.9
Average snowy days	4.8	3.0	1.4	0.2	0	0	0	0	0	0	0.8	1.6	11.8
Mean monthly sunshine hours	81.5	101.4	139.5	192.3	264.0	302.5	324.6	305.0	239.5	185.2	105.1	76.8	2,317.4
Source 1: Meteomanz (2014-2026); annalsreview.geo.unibuc.ro
Source 2: Studii și Cercetări de Geografie, Analiza de Predictibilitate A Riscurilor Climatice În Județul Constanța

== Demographics ==
Historical population
Year	Pop.	±%
1912	1,929	—
1930	2,764	+43.3%
1948	4,547	+64.5%
1956	4,792	+5.4%
1966	12,674	+164.5%
1977	26,821	+111.6%
1992	43,960	+63.9%
2002	40,037	−8.9%
2011	36,364	−9.2%
2021	31,950	−12.1%
Source: Census data

At the 2021 census Mangalia had a population of 31,950 with a majority of Romanians (74.27%) and minorities of Tatars (3.07%), Turks (2.01%), Lipovans (0.19%), Roma (0.18%), Hungarians (0.13%), Bulgarians (0.01%), others (0.78%) and unknown (19.36%).

At the 2011 census Mangalia had a population of 36,364 with a majority of Romanians (82.4%) and minorities of Turks (4.05%), Tatars (3.25%), Roma (0.45%), Lipovans (0.32%), Hungarians (0.23%), others (0.14%) and unknown (9.16%).

According to the religion of the respondents for whom data is available, 89.5% were Romanian Orthodox, 8.3% Muslim, 0.9% Roman Catholic, 0.3% Pentecostal, and 1% other or none.

== Tourist attractions ==
- The city has been well known in recent years as the place where one of the largest summer festivals in Romania takes place: Callatis Festival;
- The Scythian tomb discovered in 1959 where archaeologists unearthed fragments of a papyrus in Greek, the first document of this kind in Romania;
- The incineration tombs (the necropolis of the Callatis citadel, dating back to the 4th-2nd centuries BC);
- The ruins of the Callatis citadel (6th century BC);
- The Turkish Esmahan Sultan Mosque (16th century);
- The Archaeology Museum which shelters a rich collection of amphorae and sculptures from the Hellenistic epoch, fragments of stone sarcophagi;
- Mangalia Marina

=== Gallery ===
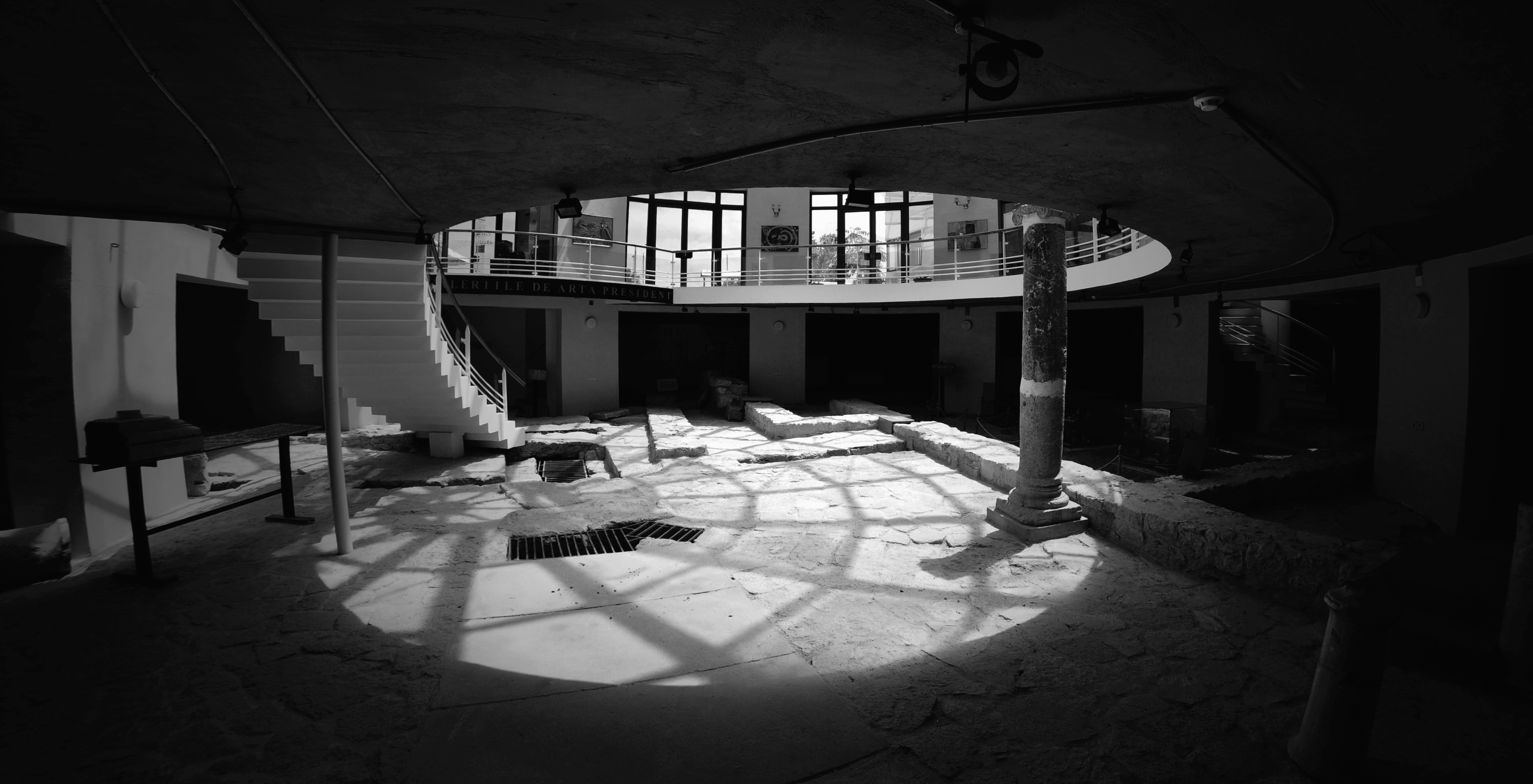
4th-/7th-century Roman-Byzantine archaeological display from the ancient city of Callatis, housed in the basement of Hotel New Belvedere

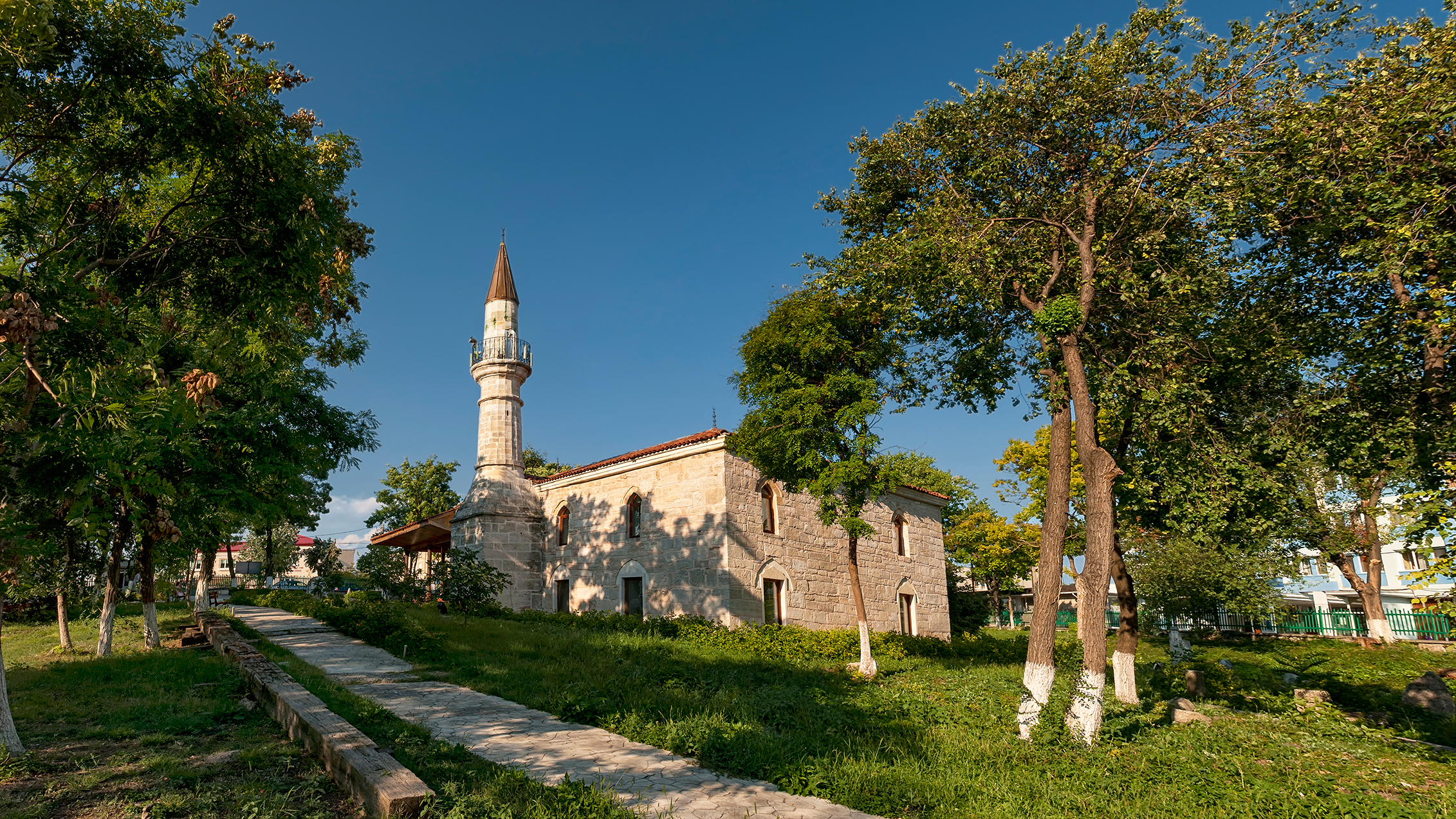
Esmahan Sultan Mosque

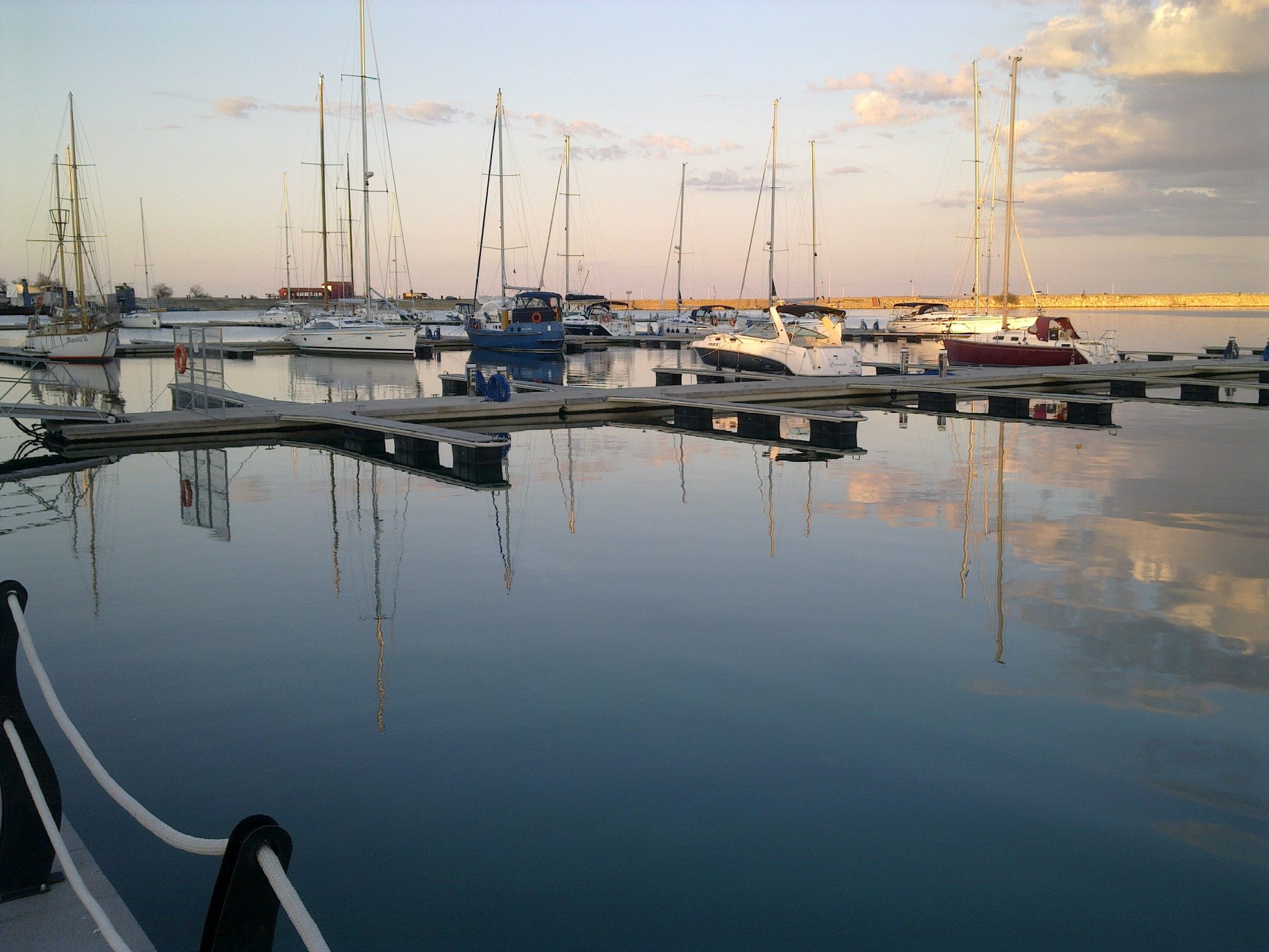
Marina

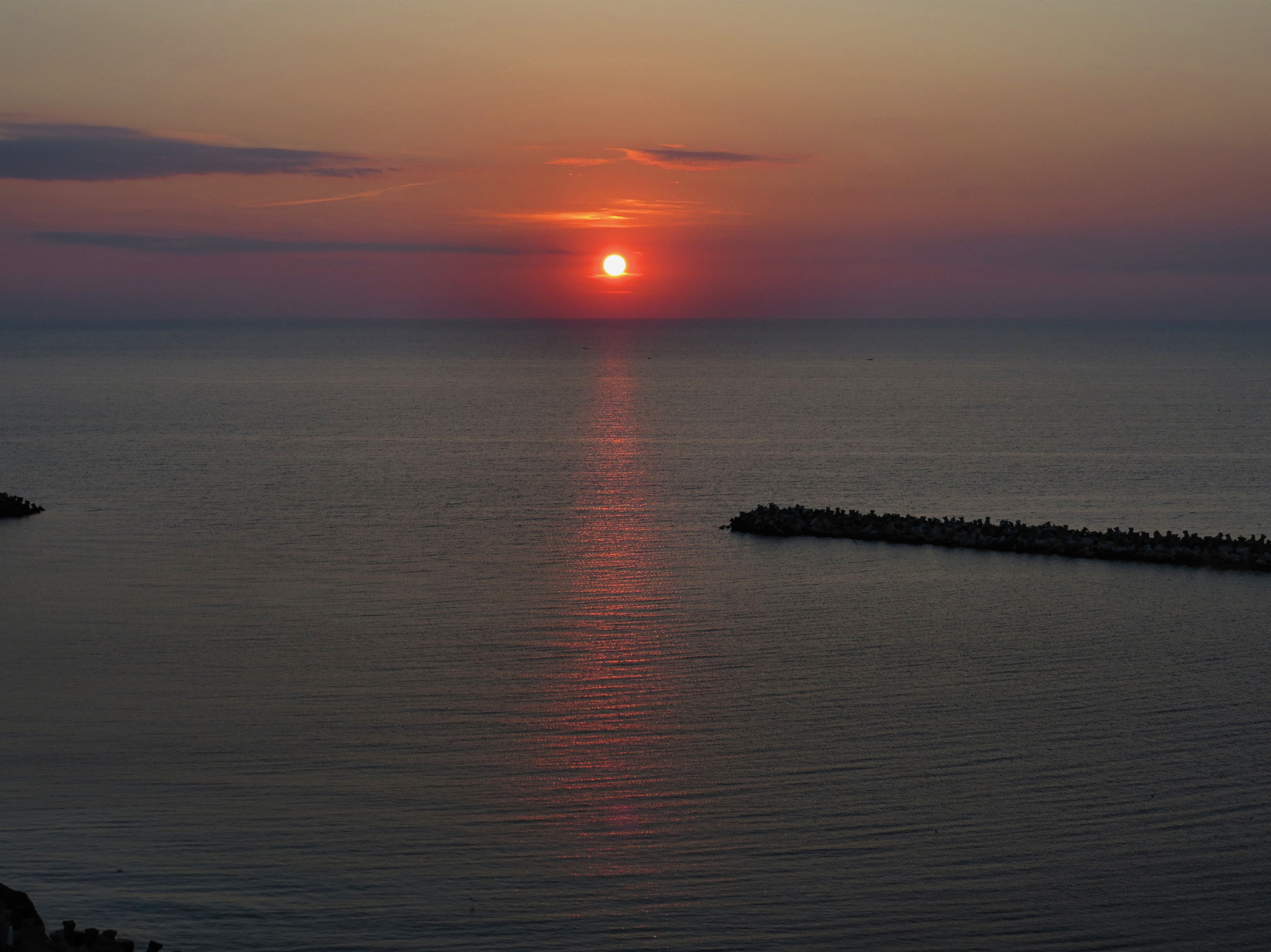
Sunrise in Mangalia

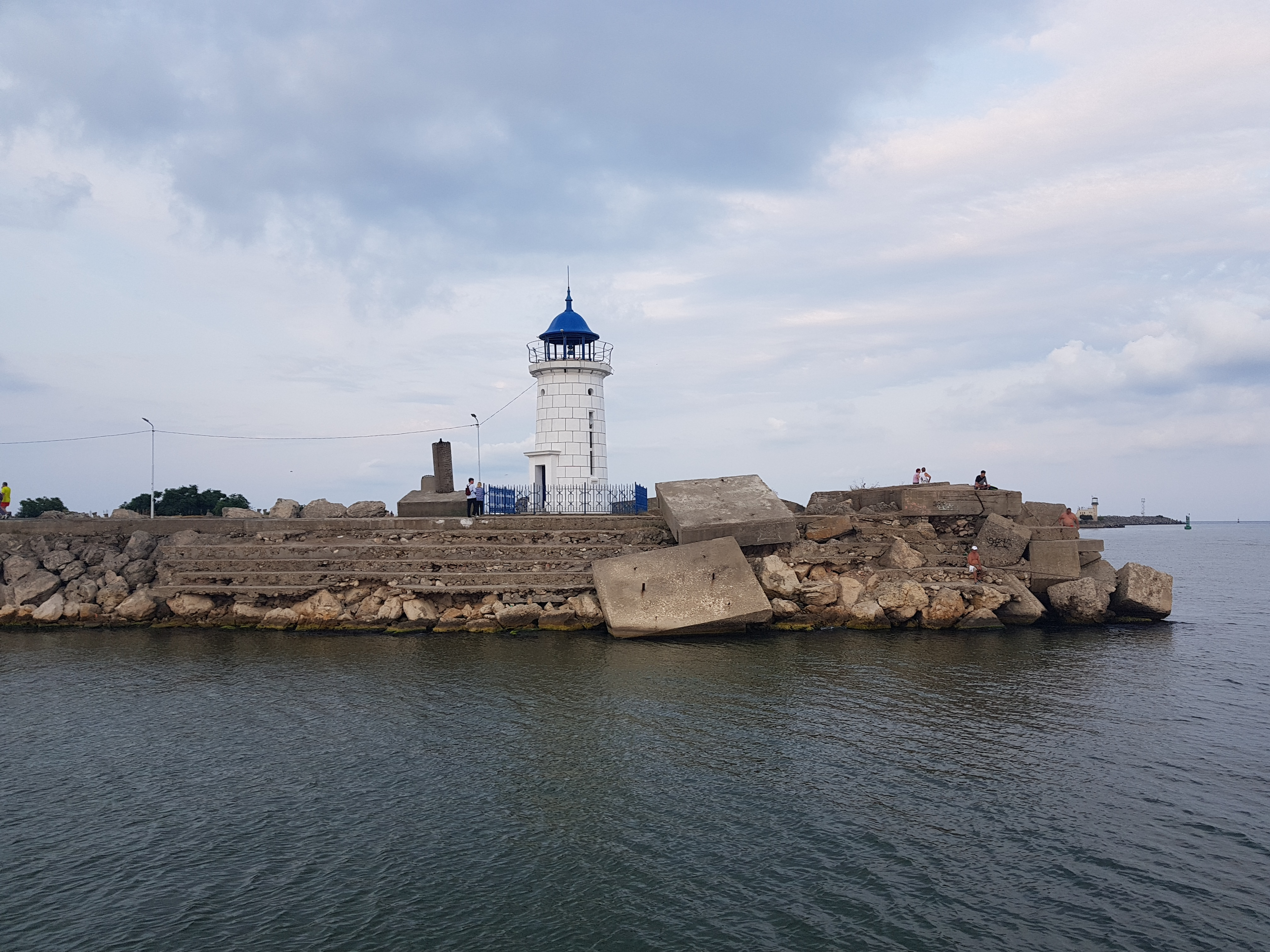
Genoese Lighthouse

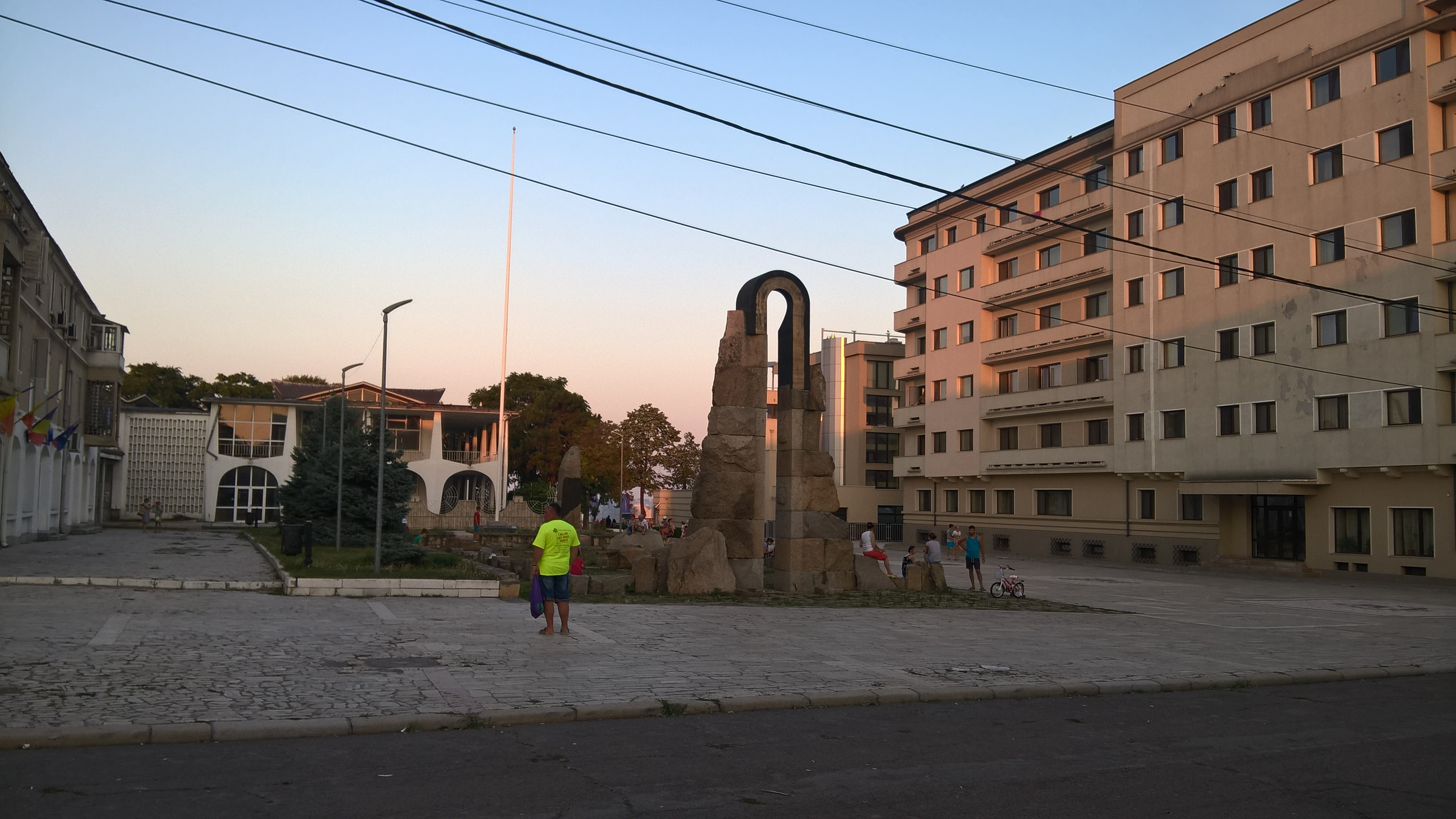
Still from Mangalia, downtown

== Natives ==
- Denis Alibec (born 1991), footballer
- Andreea Ana (born 2000), freestyle wrestler
- Marius Antonescu (born 1992), rugby union player
- Florin Bejan (born 1991), footballer
- Radu Doicaru (born 1979), footballer
- Inna (born 1986), singer
- Mihai Lămboiu (born 1997), rugby union player
- Rareș Murariu (born 1999), footballer
- Claudia Pavel (born 1984), pop singer and dancer
- Antoaneta Sabău (born 1982), classicist, translator, and editor
- Satyrus the Peripatetic (c. 3rd century BC), Greek peripatetic philosopher and historian
- Gheorghe Vitanidis (1929–1994), film director

== Politics ==
The current mayor of Mangalia is Paul Foleanu (PSD).

The Mangalia Municipal Council, elected in the 2020 local government elections, is made up of 19 councilors, with the following party composition:

Party	Seats	Current Council
National Liberal Party (PNL)	10	
PSD+ALDE+PNȚCD	5	
Romanian Ecologist Party (PER)	3	
PRO Romania (PRO)	1	

== International relations ==
Mangalia is twinned with:

- Aywaille, Belgium
- Balchik, Bulgaria
- Banská Bystrica, Slovakia
- Byblos, Lebanon
- Charleville-Mézières, France
- General Toshevo, Bulgaria
- Greenport, United States
- Karmiel, Israel
- Laurium, Greece
- Pale, Bosnia and Herzegovina
- Porto Viro, Italy
- Santa Severina, Italy
- Struga, North Macedonia
