= Saturn, Romania =

Saturn
- Beach
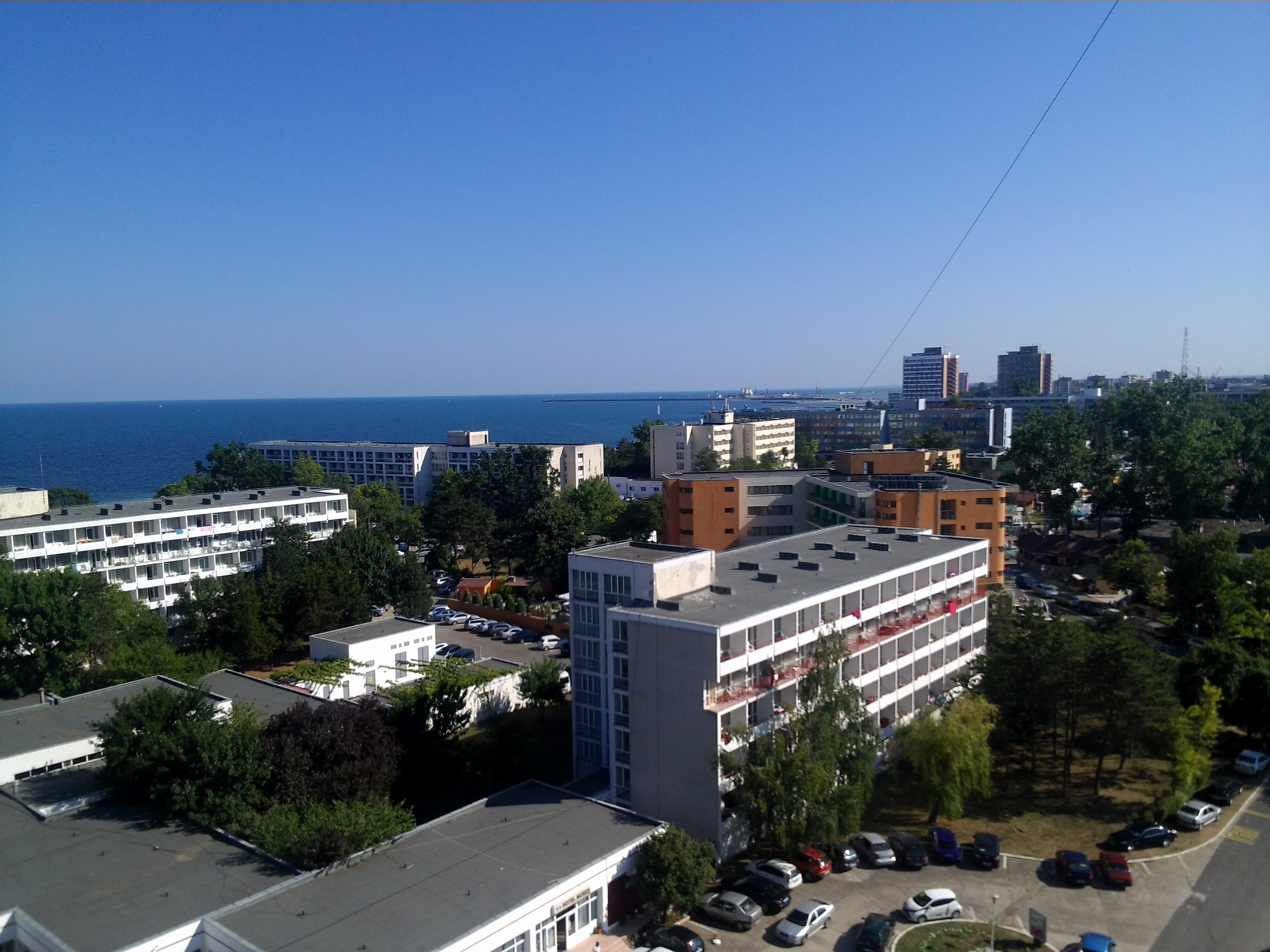
- The Black Sea coast at Saturn

- Location in Romania
- Coordinates: 43°49′36″N 28°35′20″E

Saturn is a summer resort on the Romanian seacoast, on the Black Sea, 1 km (0.62 mi) north of Mangalia.

== Features and climate ==
Completed in 1972, the resort features two major beaches: Adras Beach, located in the northern part of the resort, closer to Venus, and Diana Beach in the south, located near the town of Mangalia. The climate in the area of Comorova is warmer compared to other seaside resorts such as Mamaia, Eforie or Costinești. This is because the Comorova resorts are located in the southernmost area, but also because of the reduce of Comorova forest which cooled the area. In winter, aside from several guards and maintenance staff, the resort is deserted.
