= Cap Aurora =

- Resort
- Location in Romania
- Coordinates: 43°50′59″N 28°36′11″E
- Country: Romania
- County: Constanța County
- Municipality: Mangalia

Cap Aurora is a small Romanian summer-time seaside resort in the Mangalia municipality, Constanța County. It is located between the neighbouring resorts of Jupiter and Venus, also within the municipality.
