= Olimp, Romania =

Olimp
- Beach
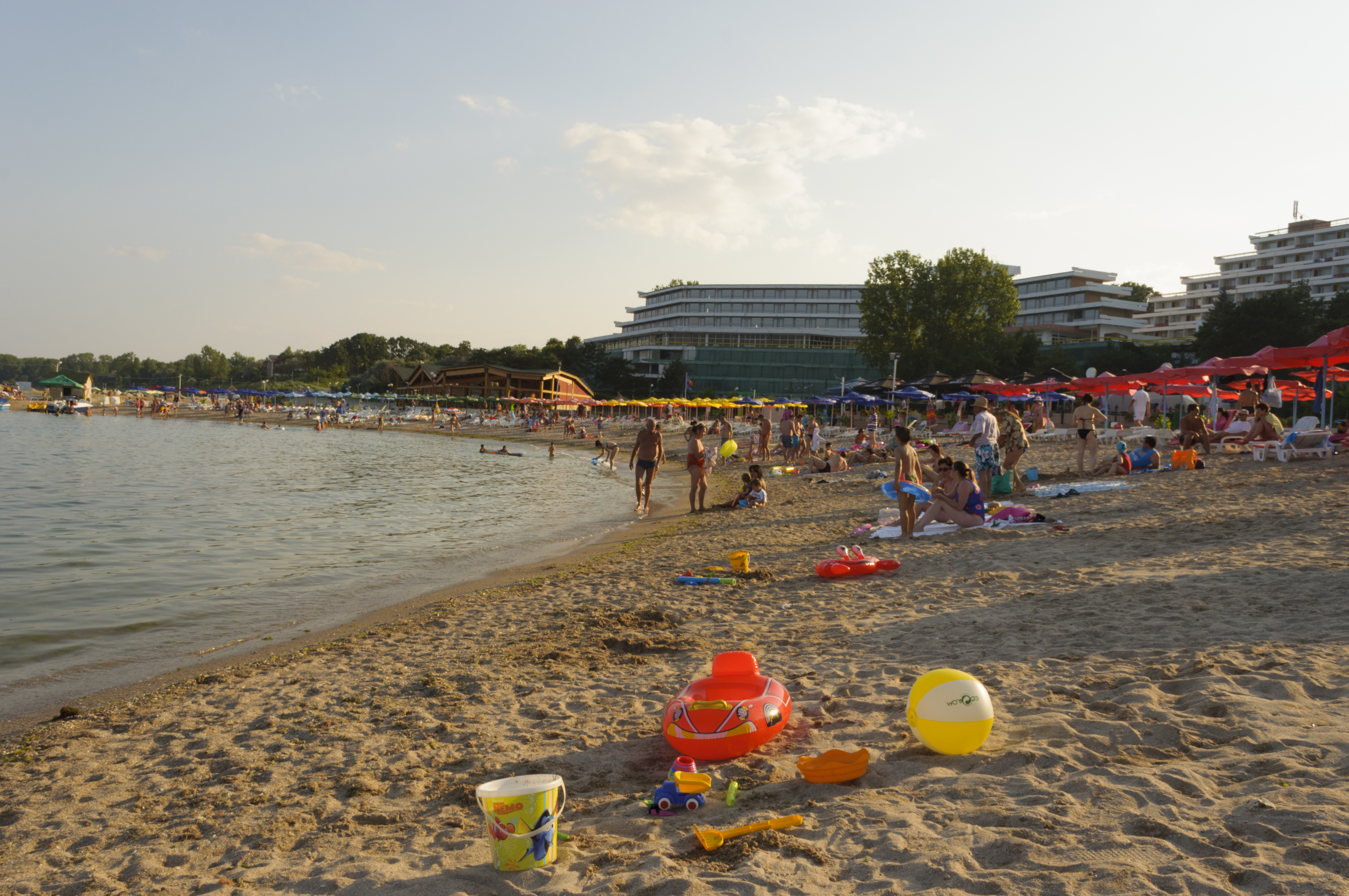
- Panorama view of Olimp

- Location in Romania
- Coordinates: 43°53′02″N 28°36′21″E

Olimp is a summer resort on the Romanian seaside, on the Black Sea, 7 km (4.3 mi) north of Mangalia. The Comorova forest is near the summer resort. It has a tall waterfront between the beach and many hotels.

During the communist period, this resort was very expensive, being considered luxurious and reserved for important “comrades” and “honored guests” (for example, general secretaries of Western communist parties or Western communist intellectuals invited by Nicolae Ceaușescu). Today, it is no longer as sought-after, and those who come here are mainly looking for peace and relaxation.

Olimp has a high cliff that offers a panorama over the Black Sea, and the beach is crowded throughout the entire summer season. The beach of Olimp resort has two characteristics: the southern part toward Neptun is a narrow beach, bordered by a fairly high cliff. This is followed by a stretch of wild beach between Olimp, 23 August, and Tuzla, which is not frequented by tourists except for groups of nudists; here the beach is wider but undeveloped. The resort offers accommodation consisting of hotels and villas.
