= Tourism in Romania =

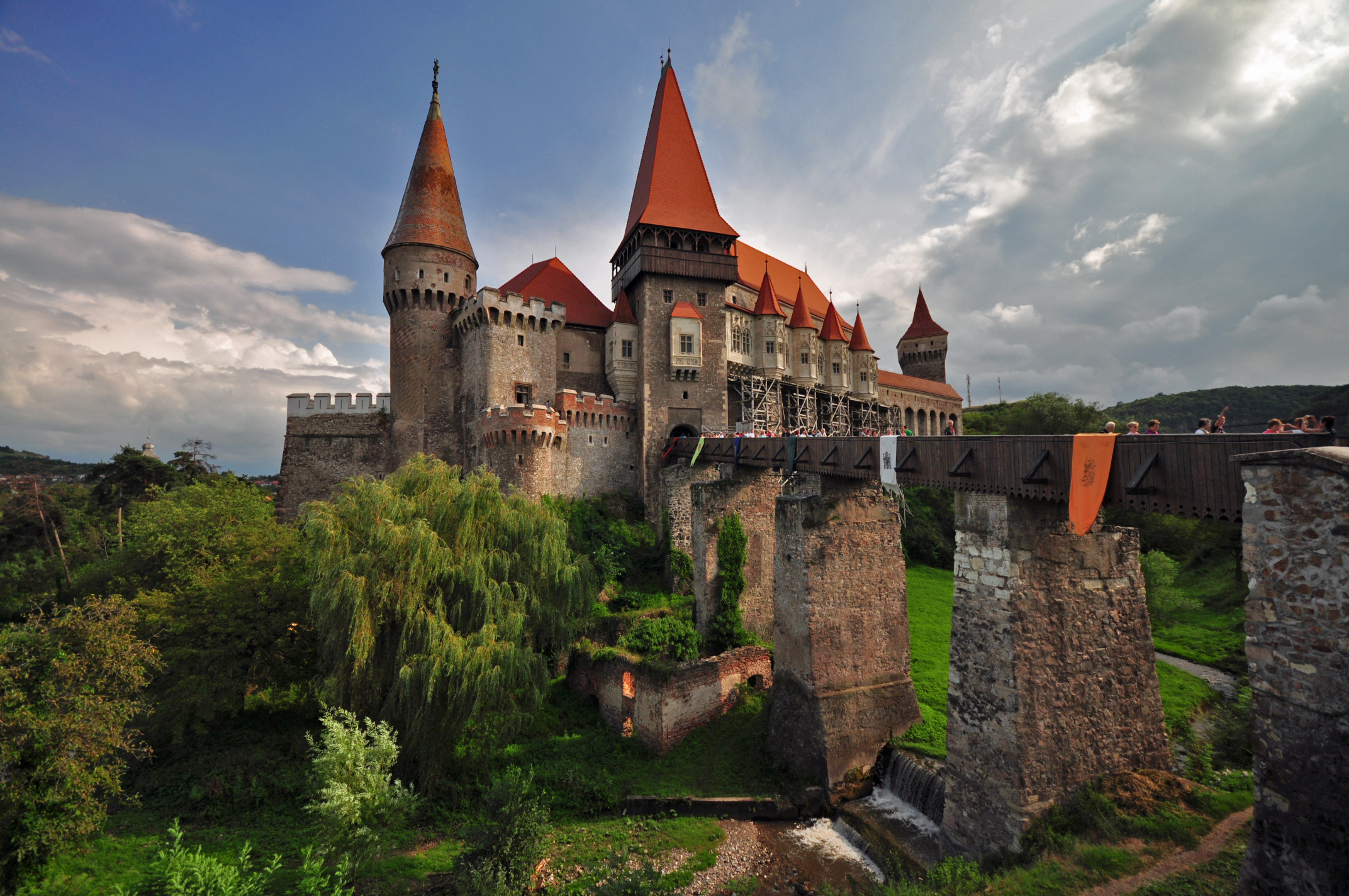
Corvin Castle in Hunedoara

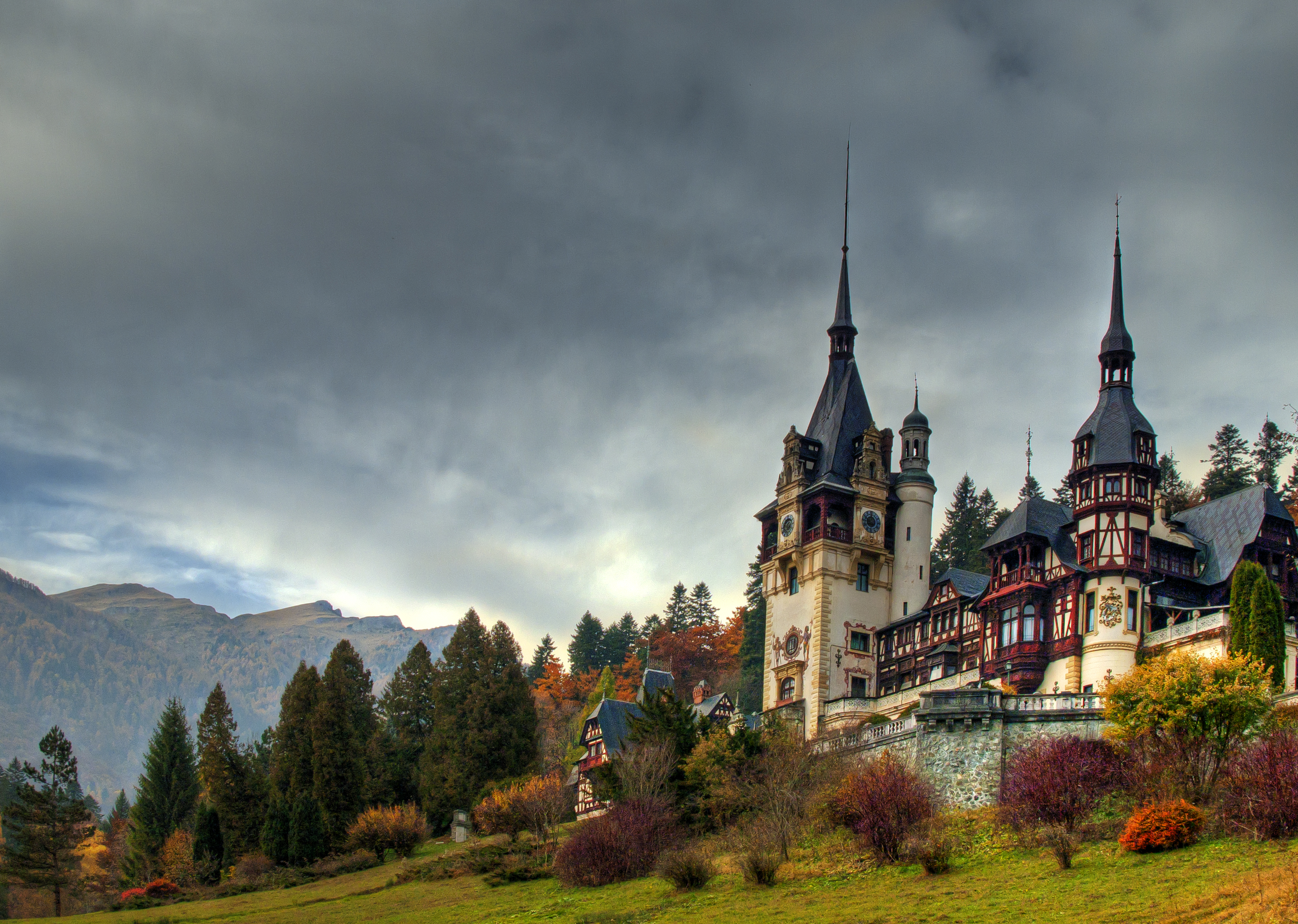
Peleș Castle in Sinaia

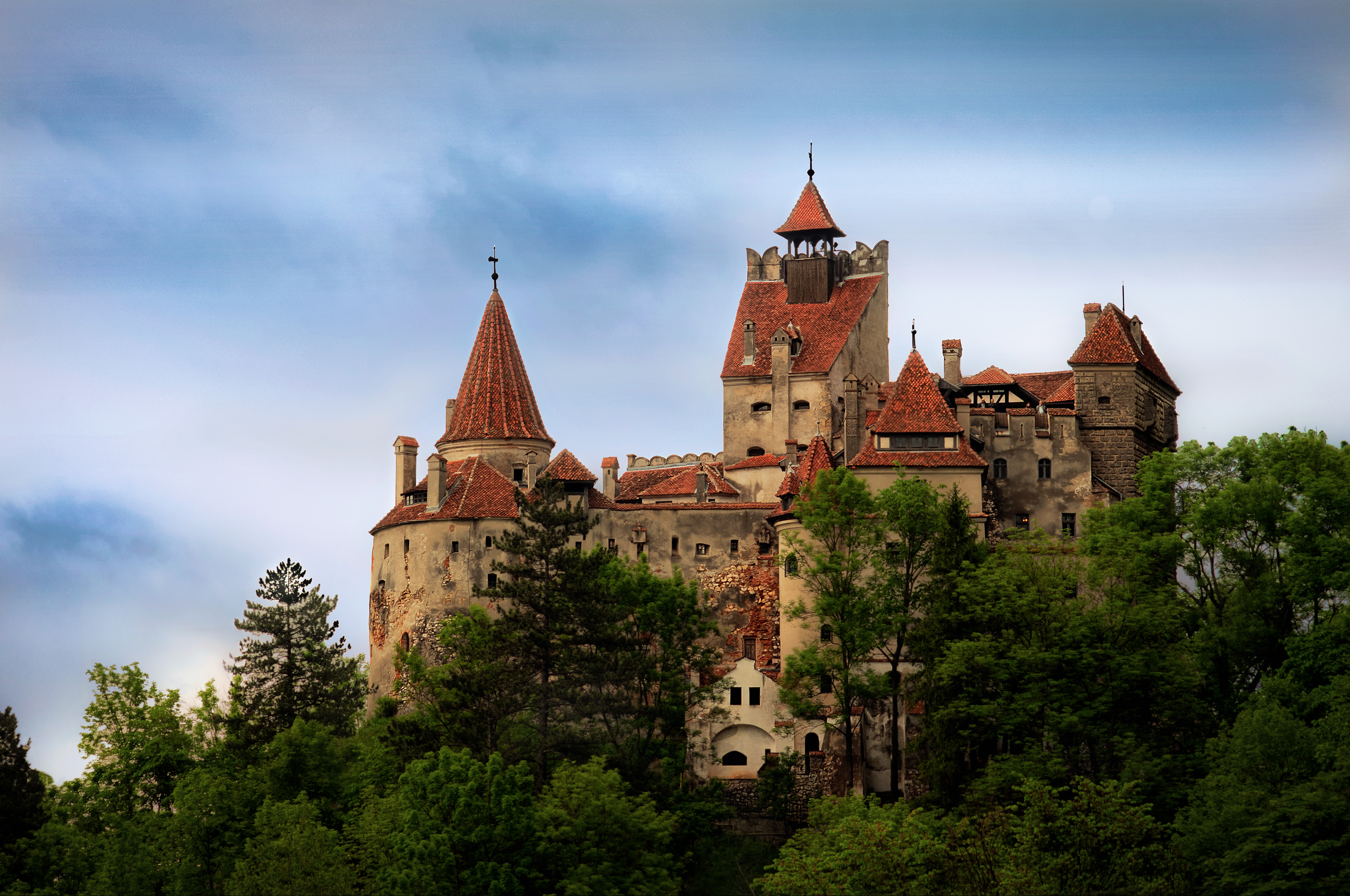
Bran Castle in Brașov

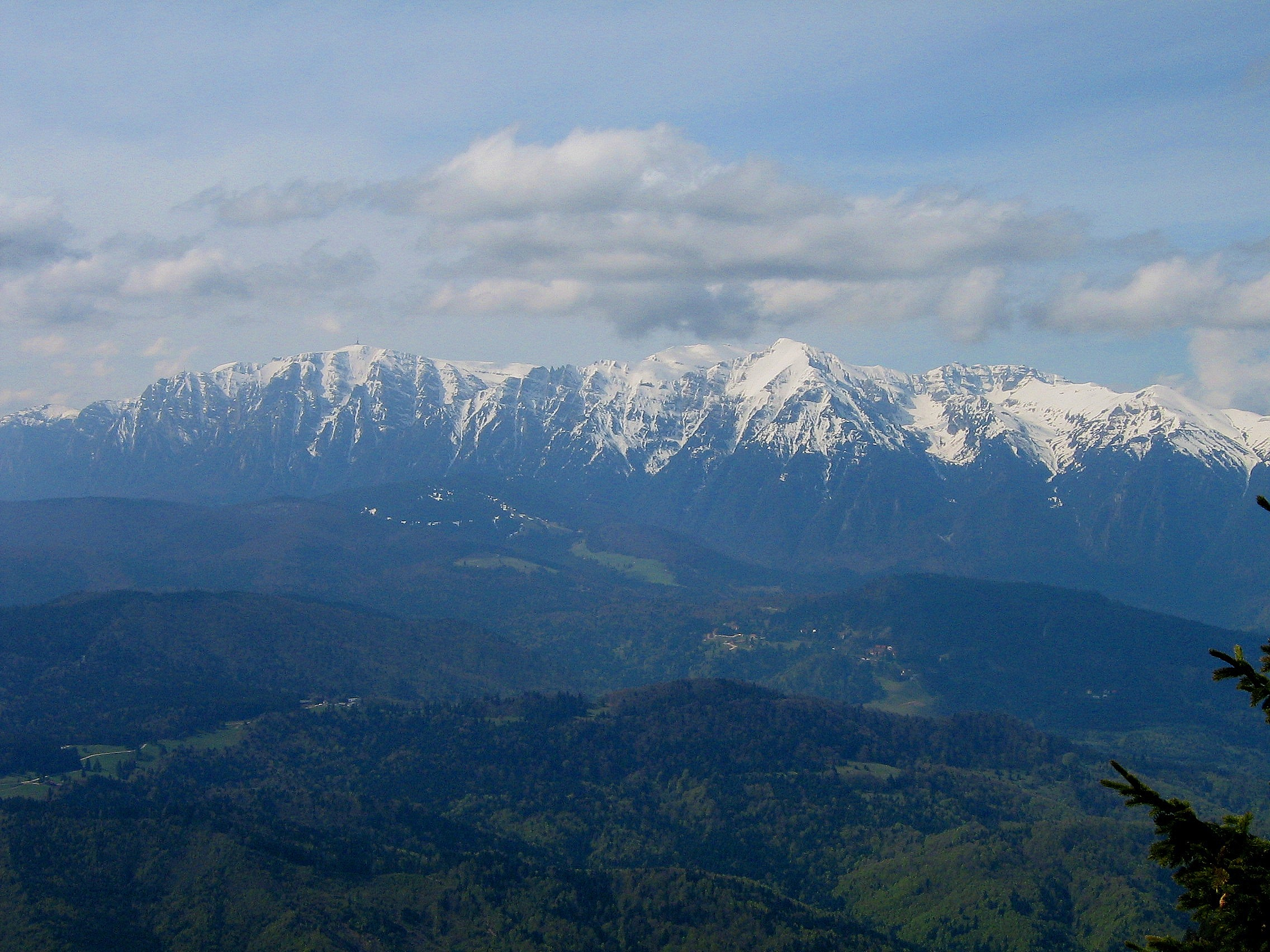
Bucegi Mountains in Brașov

In December 2024, Romania's tourism sector had a 6.8% increase in arrivals at accommodation facilities, including hotels, apartments, and rental rooms, compared to December 2023. in authorized lodging facilities, marking increases of 4.5% over 2023 Overnight stays also rose by 4.9% during the same period. At border crossing points, Romania recorded 916,100 foreign visitor arrivals, while the number of Romanian residents traveling abroad reached 1,007,600.

In 2024, the National Institute of Statistics reported that Romania recorded over 14 million arrivals in authorized lodging facilities, marking increases of 4.5% over 2023 and 7.7% compared to 2019, with overnight stays reaching 30.2 million. Early trends for 2025 continue to reflect strong domestic interest, particularly along the Romanian Black Sea resorts and in emerging sectors such as Ecotourism.

The most visited cities are Bucharest, Constanța, Brașov, Timișoara, Sibiu, Alba-Iulia, Cluj-Napoca, Sighișoara, Iași and Oradea. Natural touristic attractions include the Danube, the Carpathian Mountains, and the Black Sea. The most popular destinations for tourists are the capital city Bucharest, Brașov County, Cluj County, Prahova County, Constanța County, Bihor County, Sibiu County, Timiș County and Iași County.

== UNESCO World Heritage Sites in Romania ==
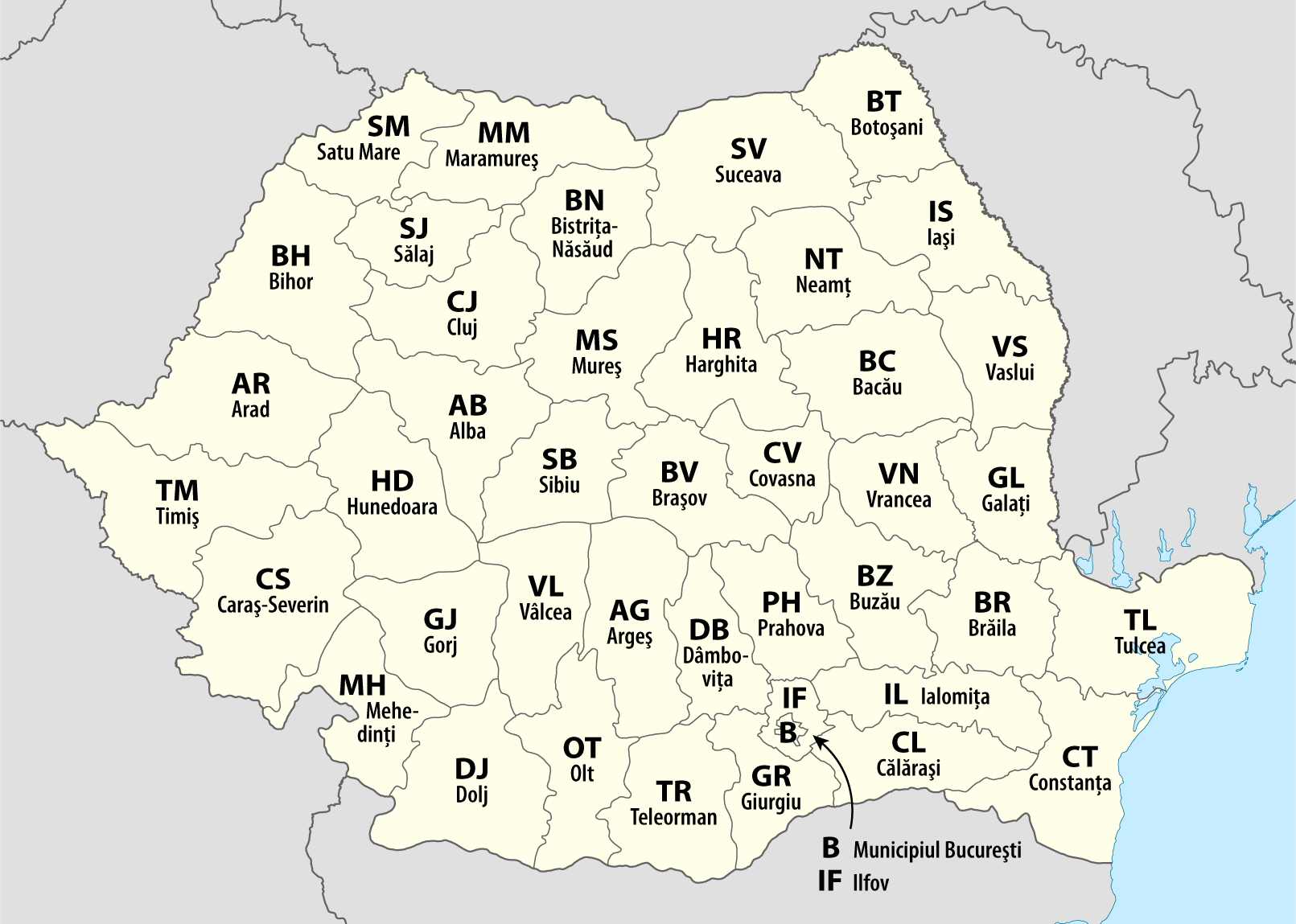
Administrative divisions of Romania

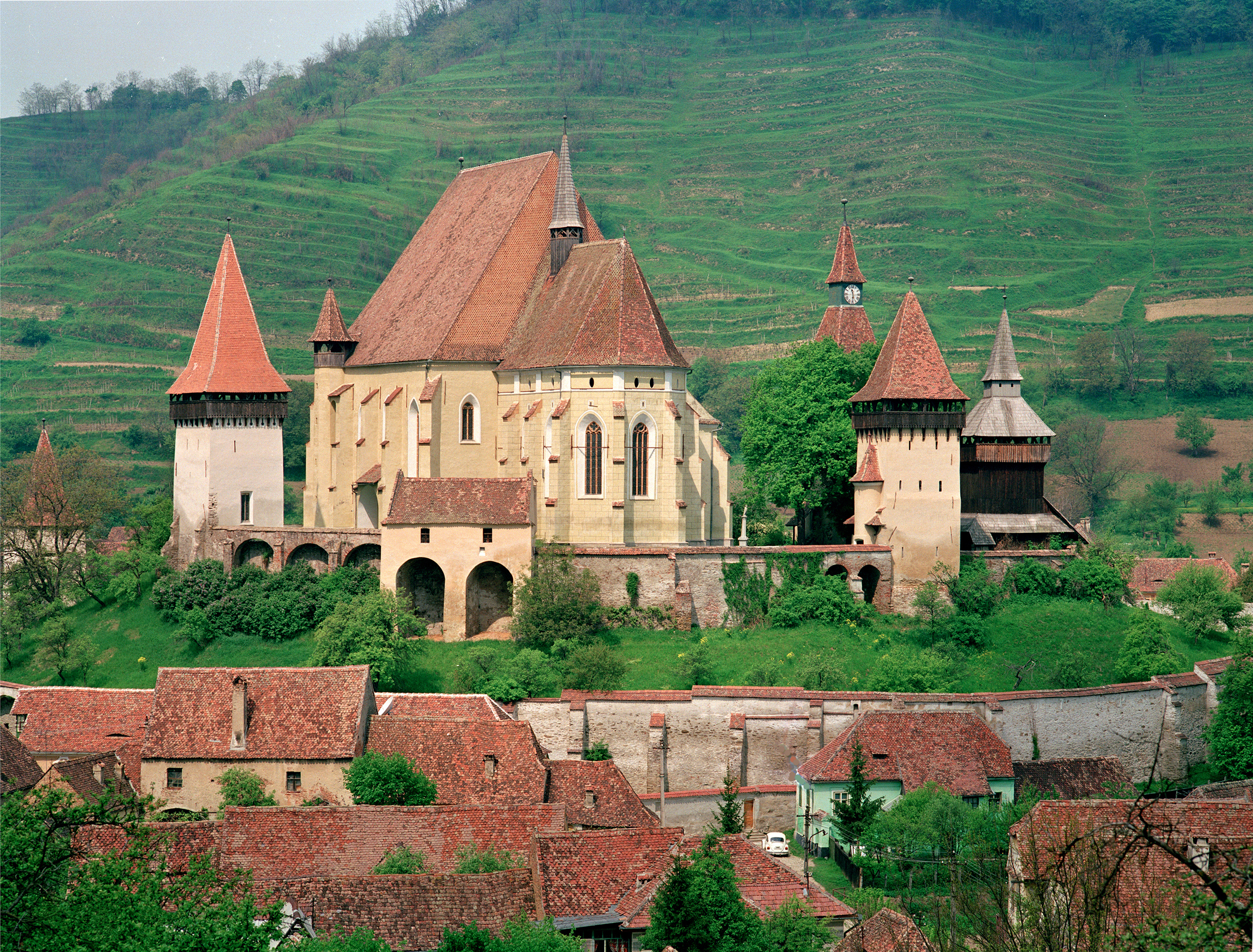
Biertan (German: Birthälm) Transylvanian Saxon medieval fortified church in Sibiu County, central Romania

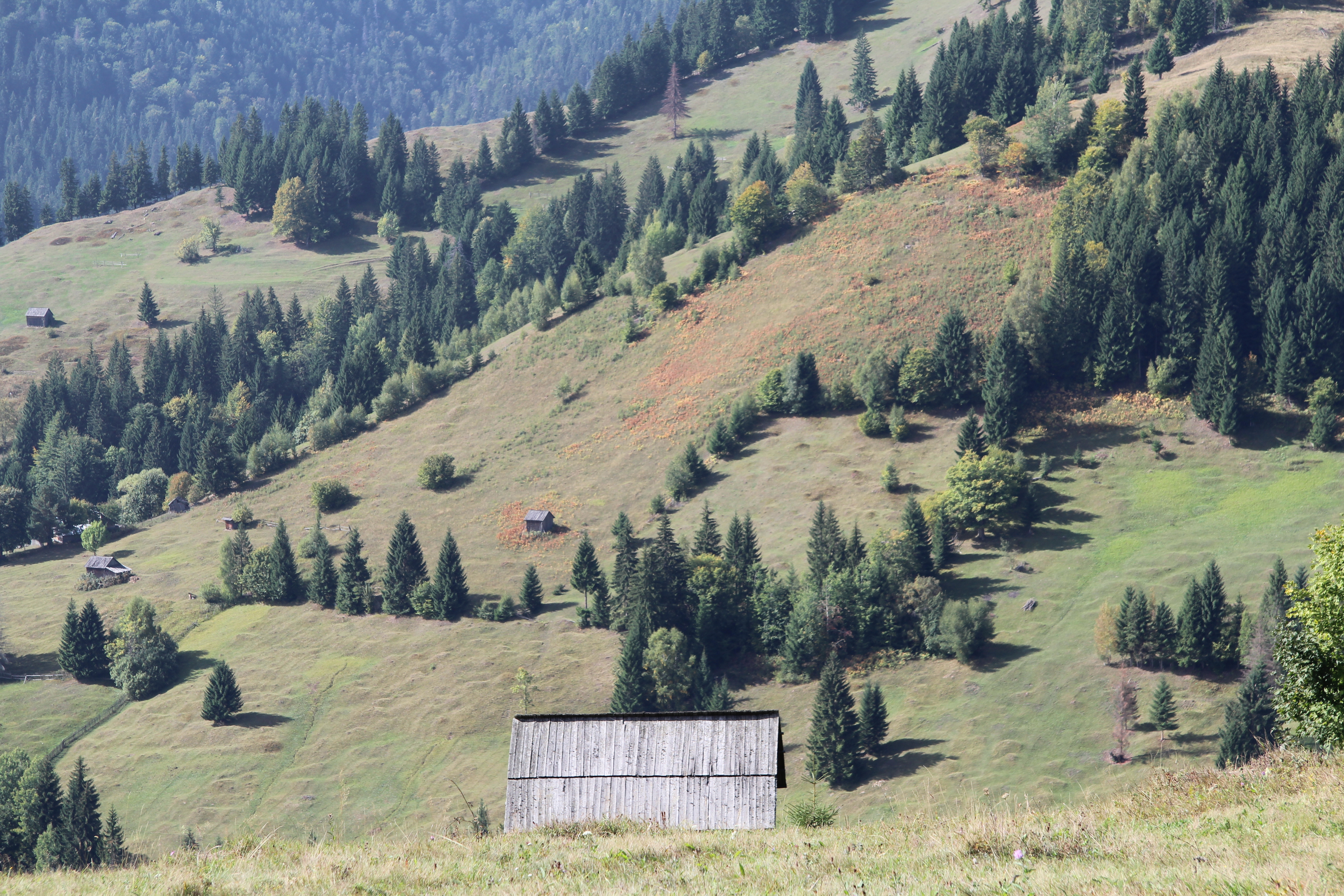
Slătioara secular forest near Câmpulung Moldovenesc in Suceava County, northeastern Romania

- Churches of Moldavia – The eight Romanian Orthodox Churches of Moldavia are located in Suceava County, northern Moldavia, (Bukovina) and were built approximately between 1487 and 1583.
- Dacian Fortresses of the Orăștie Mountains – The six fortresses (Sarmizegetusa Regia, Costești-Cetățuie, Costești-Blidaru, Piatra Roșie, Bănița and Căpâlna) that formed the defensive system of Decebalus were created in the 1st centuries BC and AD as protection against Roman conquest, and played an important role during the Roman-Dacian wars.
- Historic Centre of Sighișoara – It is an inhabited medieval citadel that was built in the 12th century by Saxon colonists under the Latin name Castrum Sex and it is the birthplace of Vlad III the Impaler also known by the name of Count Dracula.
- Danube Delta – It is the second largest river delta in Europe and best preserved on the continent.
- Monastery of Horezu – It was founded in 1690 by Prince Constantin Brâncoveanu in the town of Horezu, Vâlcea County, Wallachia, Romania and it is considered to be a masterpiece of "Brâncovenesc style", known for its architectural purity and balance, the richness of its sculpted detail, its treatment of religious compositions, its votive portraits, and its painted decorative works.
- Villages with fortified churches in Transylvania – They are seven villages (six Saxon and one Székely) founded by the Transylvanian Saxons. They are dominated by fortified churches and characterized by a specific settlement pattern that has been preserved since the late Middle Ages.
- Wooden Churches of Maramureș – They are high timber constructions with characteristic tall, slim bell towers at the western end of the building. They are a particular vernacular expression of the cultural landscape of this mountainous area of northern Romania. These churches are: Bârsana, Budești, Desești, Ieud, Plopiș, Poienile Izei, Rogoz, Șurdești.
- Primeval Beech Forests of the Carpathians and Other Regions of Europe

== Activities ==
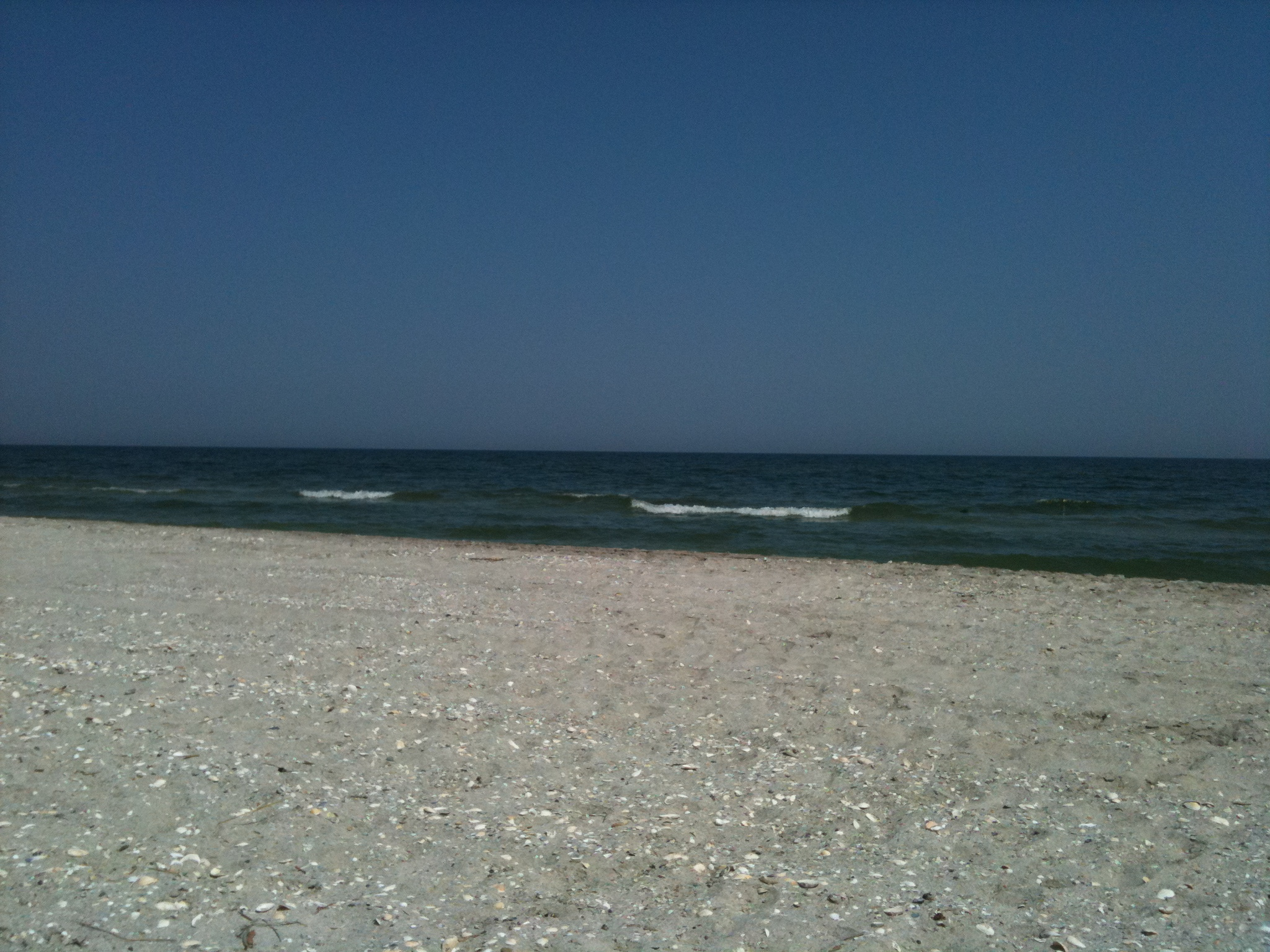
Protected virgin beach at Corbu, Constanța County, southeastern Romania

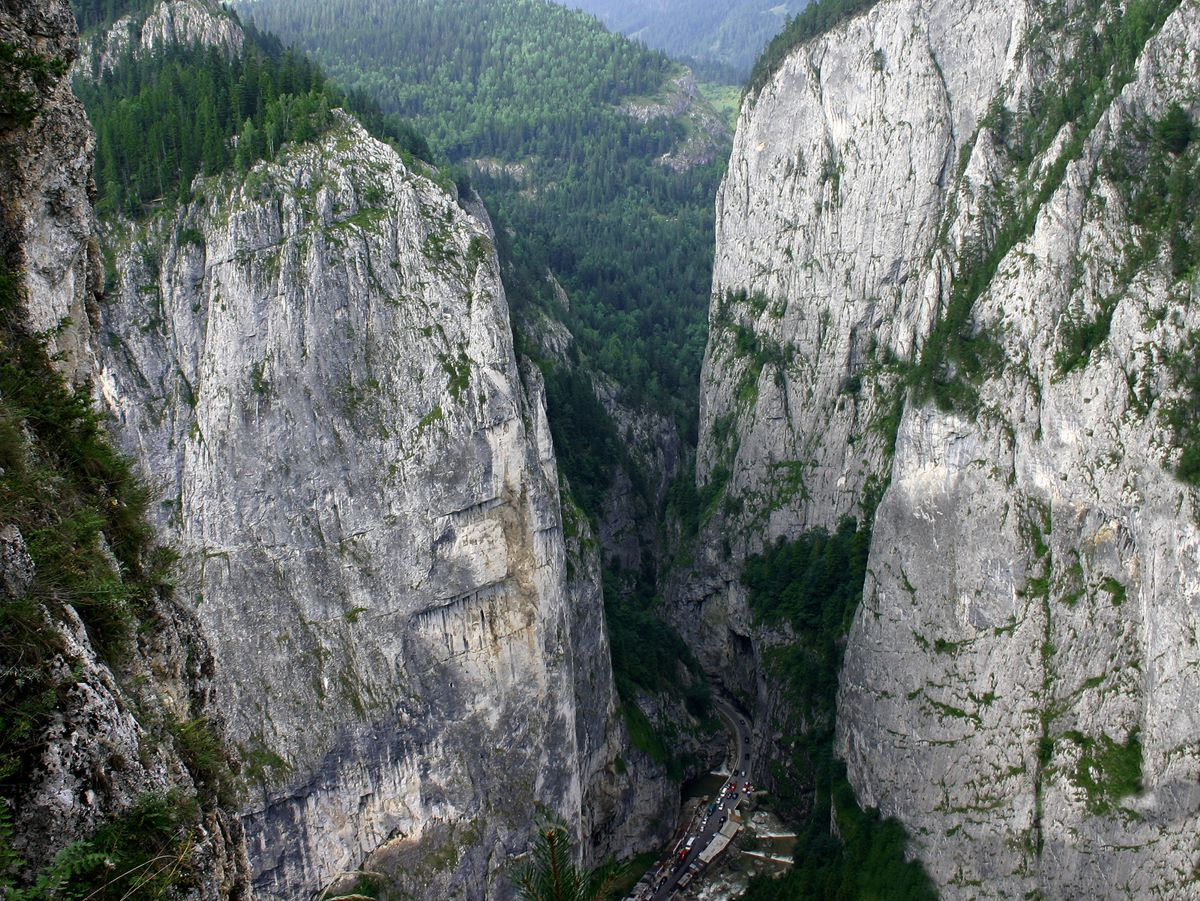
Bicaz Gorge

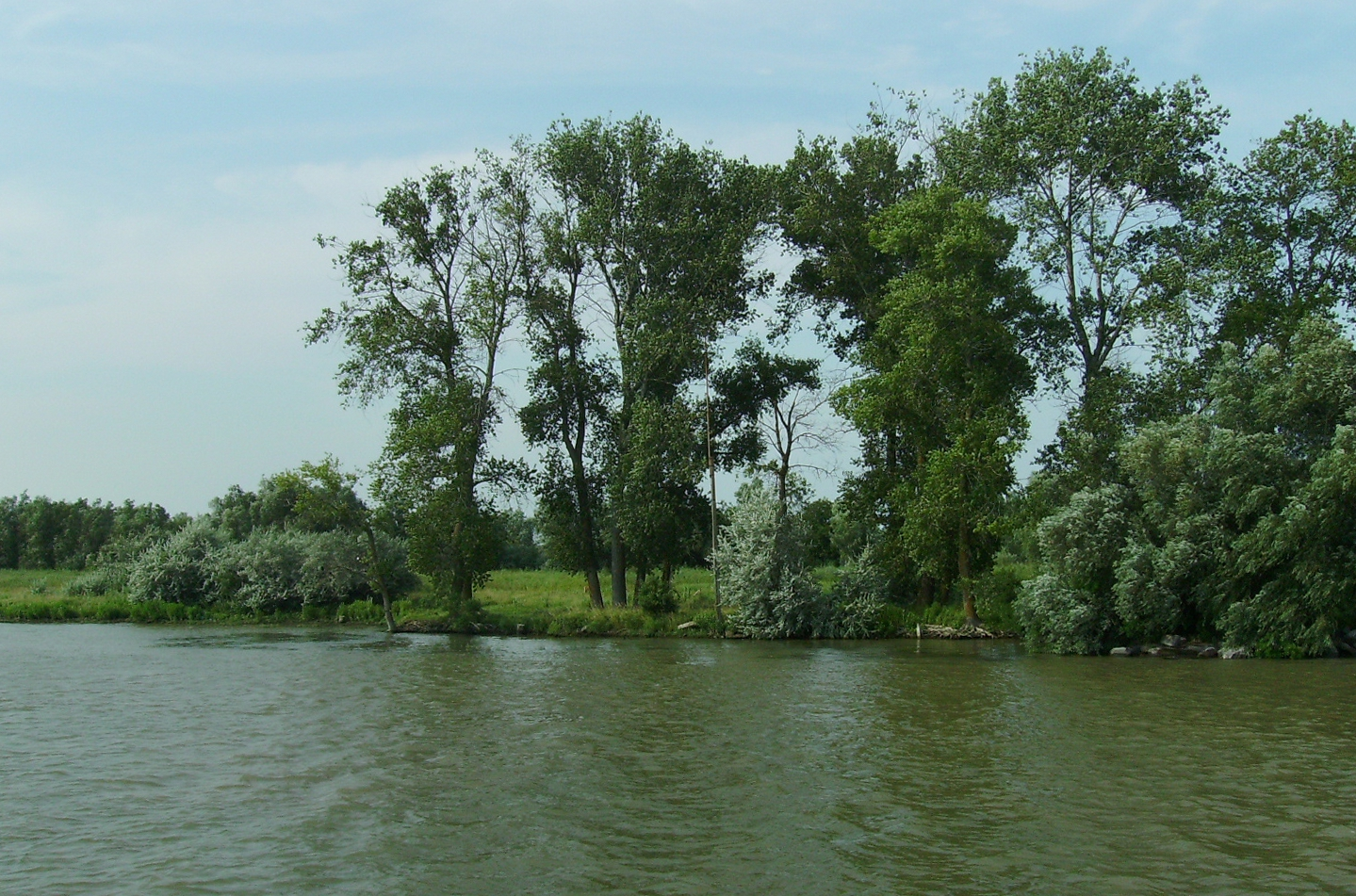
Letea Forest

- Swimming at the Black Sea resorts (from North to South): Gura Portiței, Năvodari, Mamaia, Constanța, Eforie Nord, Eforie Sud, Tuzla, Costinești, Olimp, Neptun, Jupiter, Cap Aurora, Venus, Saturn, Mangalia, 2 Mai and Vama Veche.
- Skiing in the mountain resorts: Muntele Mic, Sinaia, Bușteni, Semenic, Azuga, Straja, Păltiniș, Rânca, Cavnic, Arieșeni, Predeal and Poiana Brașov.
- Cultural cities of Bucharest, Timișoara, Sibiu, Brașov, Cluj-Napoca, Oradea, Arad, Alba Iulia, Sighișoara, Târgu Mureș, and Iași.
- Rural tourism, which mainly revolves around the folklore and traditions of Banat, Maramureș and Bukovina. Given their more isolated, mountainous character and diversity of the population, the inhabitants of these two northern Romanian regions have kept old traditions such as painting Easter eggs, painting houses and in some parts have even kept the old local architecture alive.
- Rural tourism in Transylvania along the Via Transilvanica, a long-distance hiking and cycling trail which includes attractions such as the villages with fortified churches or the Dacian Fortresses of the Orăștie Mountains.
- Hiking in the Carpathian Mountains with many Mountain huts available
- Spas and health resorts: Băile Herculane, Băile Felix, Buziaș, Băile Călacea, Lipova, Sovata, Călimănești, Moneasa and Techirghiol.
- Museums
- Travel with Mocănița steam-powered locomotive trains in the mountainous areas of Banat, Maramureș, Transylvania, and Bukovina.
- Travel the water channels of the Danube Delta, stay in traditional villages that can only be reached by boats such as Sfântu Gheorghe.

== Major tourist attractions ==
- Many medieval castles and fortifications
- Fortified Transylvanian Saxon medieval cities: Brașov, Râșnov, Rupea, Sighișoara, Sibiu, Cisnădie, Mediaș, Sebeș, Bistrița
- Scărișoara Cave and Bears' Cave, both located in Apuseni Mountains
- Sphinx and Babele, both situated in Bucegi Mountains
- Cheile Nerei-Beușnița National Park, Domogled-Valea Cernei National Park, Semenic-Caraș Gorge National Park, Iron Gates in Caraș-Severin County
- Ceahlău Massif and Vânători-Neamț Natural Park in Neamț County
- Cheile Bicazului-Hășmaș National Park
- Piatra Craiului Mountains
- Berca Mud Volcanoes, in Buzău County
- Merry Cemetery, in Săpânța, Maramureș County
- Palace of the Parliament, Bucharest, one of the largest buildings in the world
- Lipscani street, in the old town of Bucharest, the most important commercial area of the city and of the Principality of Wallachia from the Middle Ages to the early 19th century
- Transfăgărășan road
- Transalpina road
- Via Transilvanica
- Turda Gorge (Cheile Turzii)
- Turda Salt Mine
- Praid Salt Mines
- Iron Gates (Danube Gorge)
- Hațeg Island, Hunedoara County
- Sighișoara, a medieval fortified city in southeastern Transylvania (also the birthplace of Vlad Țepeș)
- The old town of Timișoara
- Bigăr Waterfall: according to The World Geography, Bigăr waterfall is a unique waterfall worldwide.
- Cozia National Park, with mountains, ancient ruins, and medieval castles
- Danube Delta
- Romanian Black Sea resorts
- Ancient ruins, Murfatlar Cave Complex, Măcin Mountains in Dobrogea
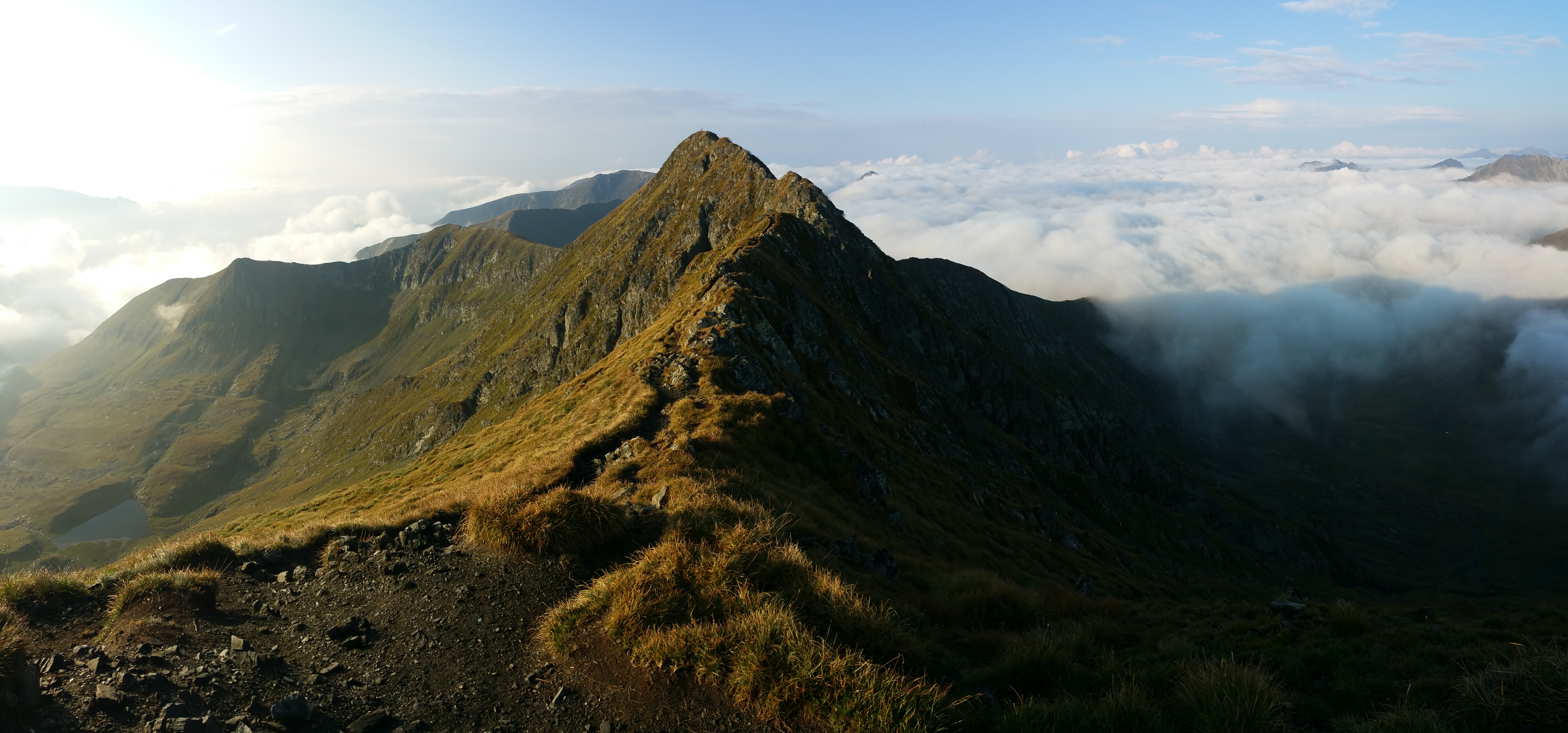
Moldoveanu Peak, the highest mountain peak in Romania

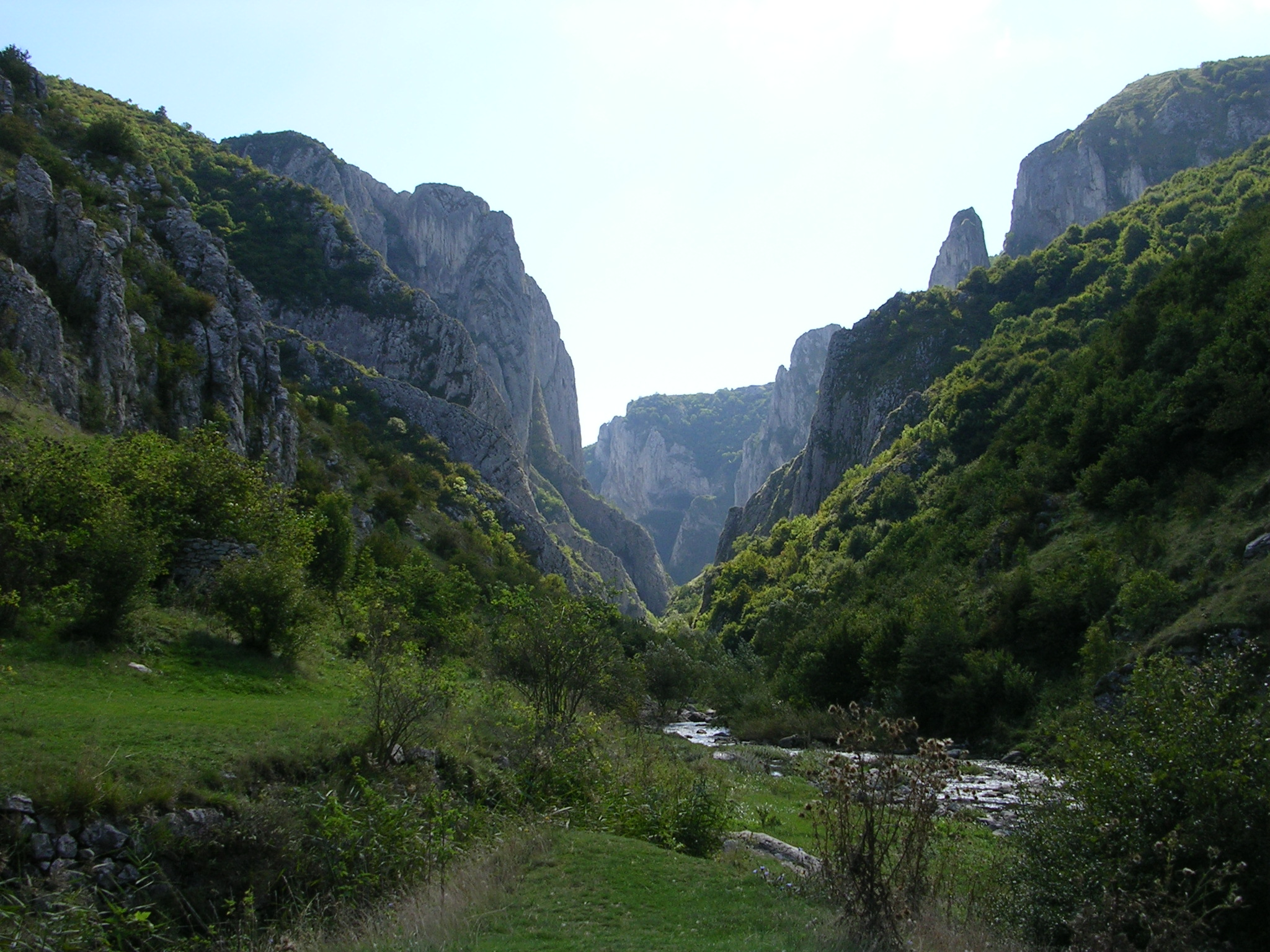
Turda Gorge

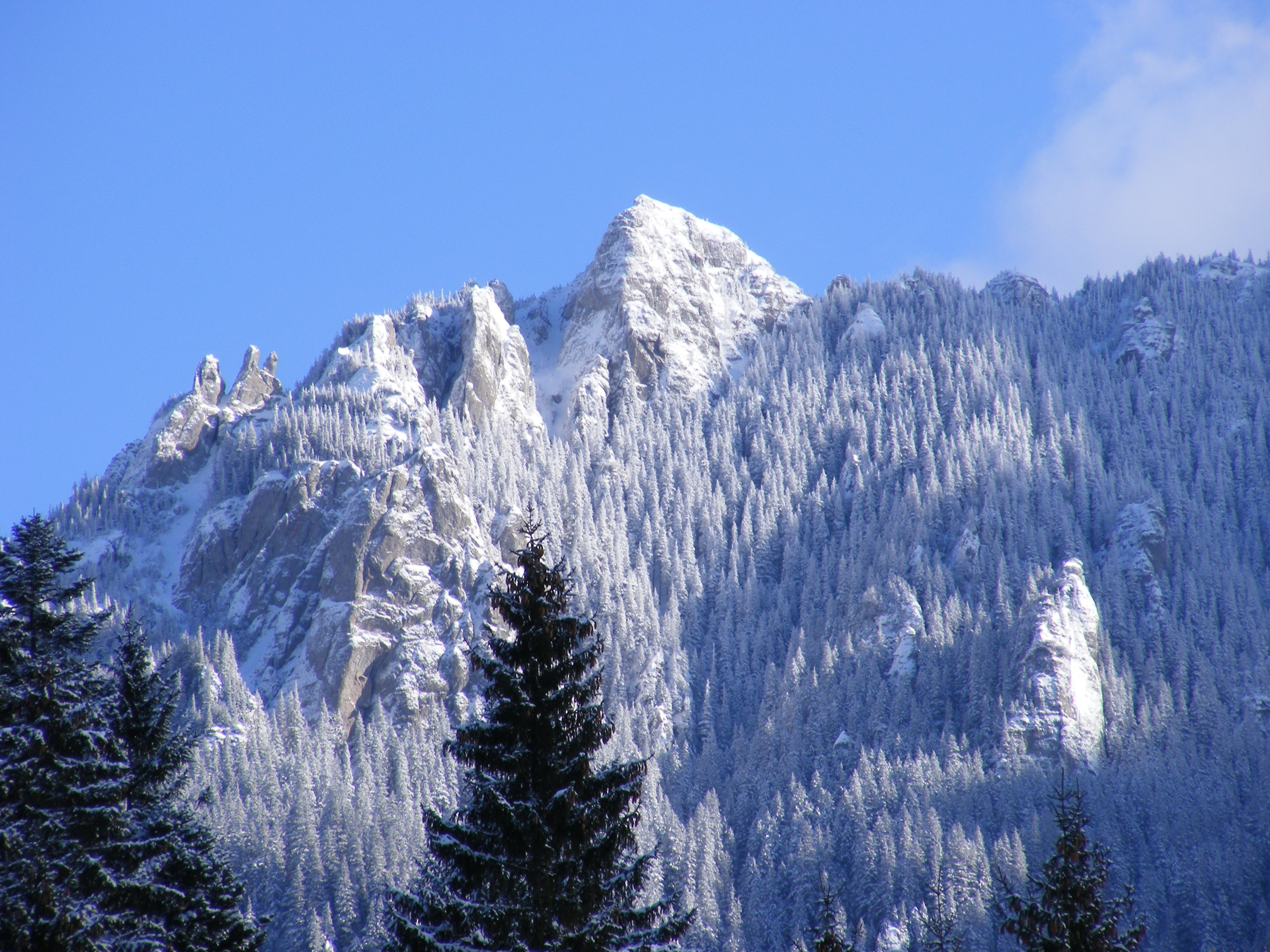
Ceahlău Massif, Bacău County

Transfăgărășan road

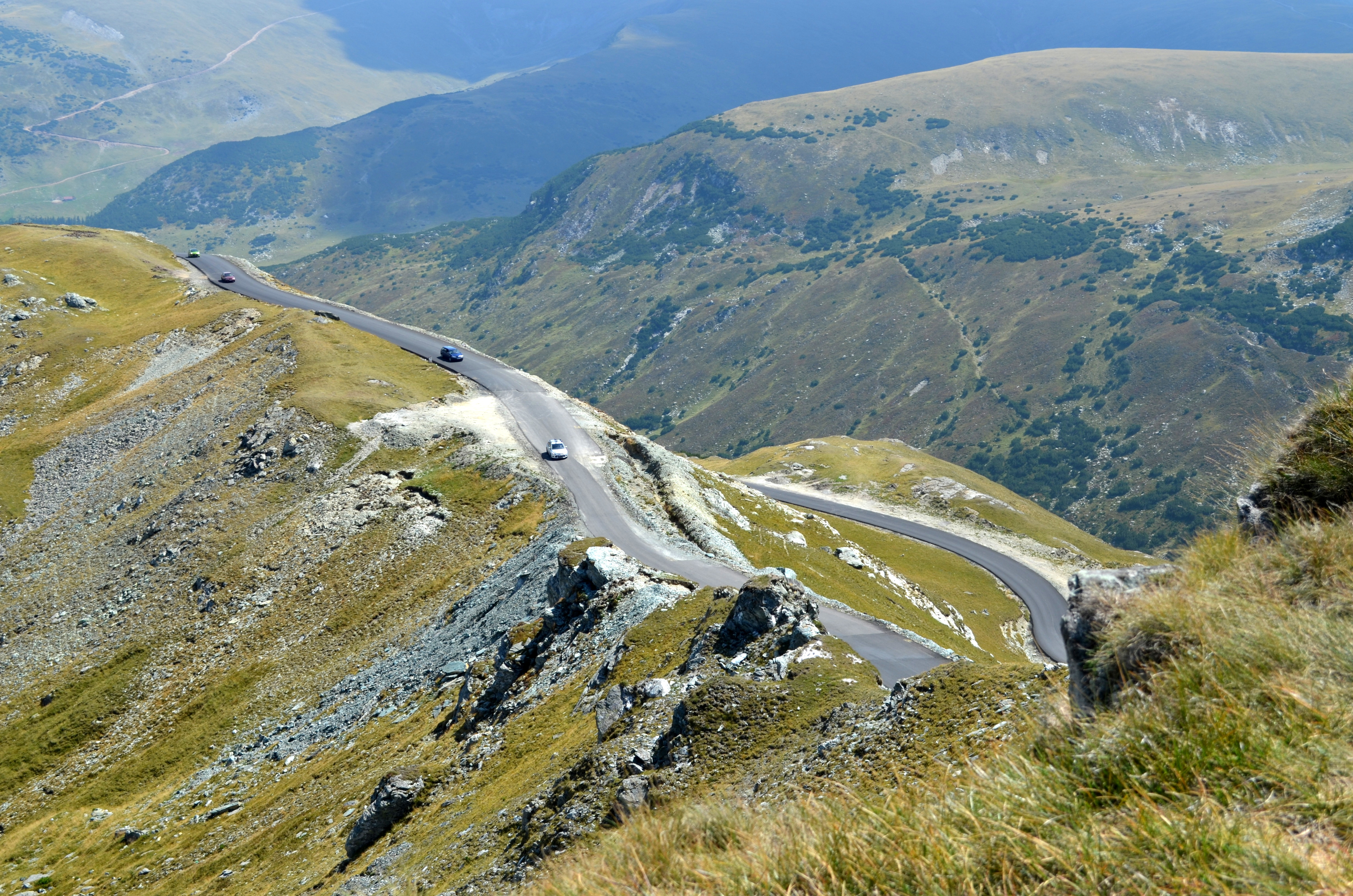
Transalpina road

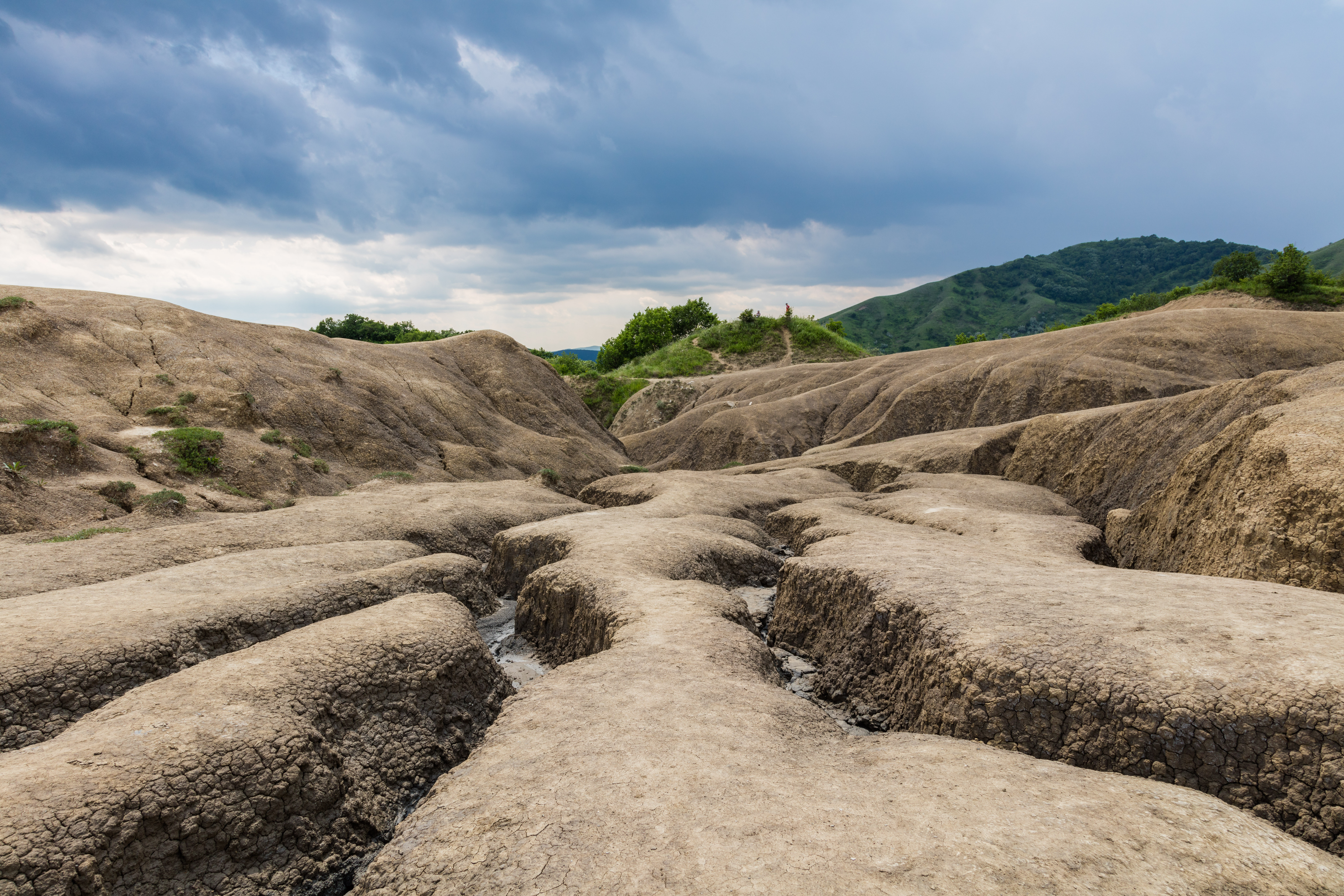
Berca Mud Volcanoes, Buzău County

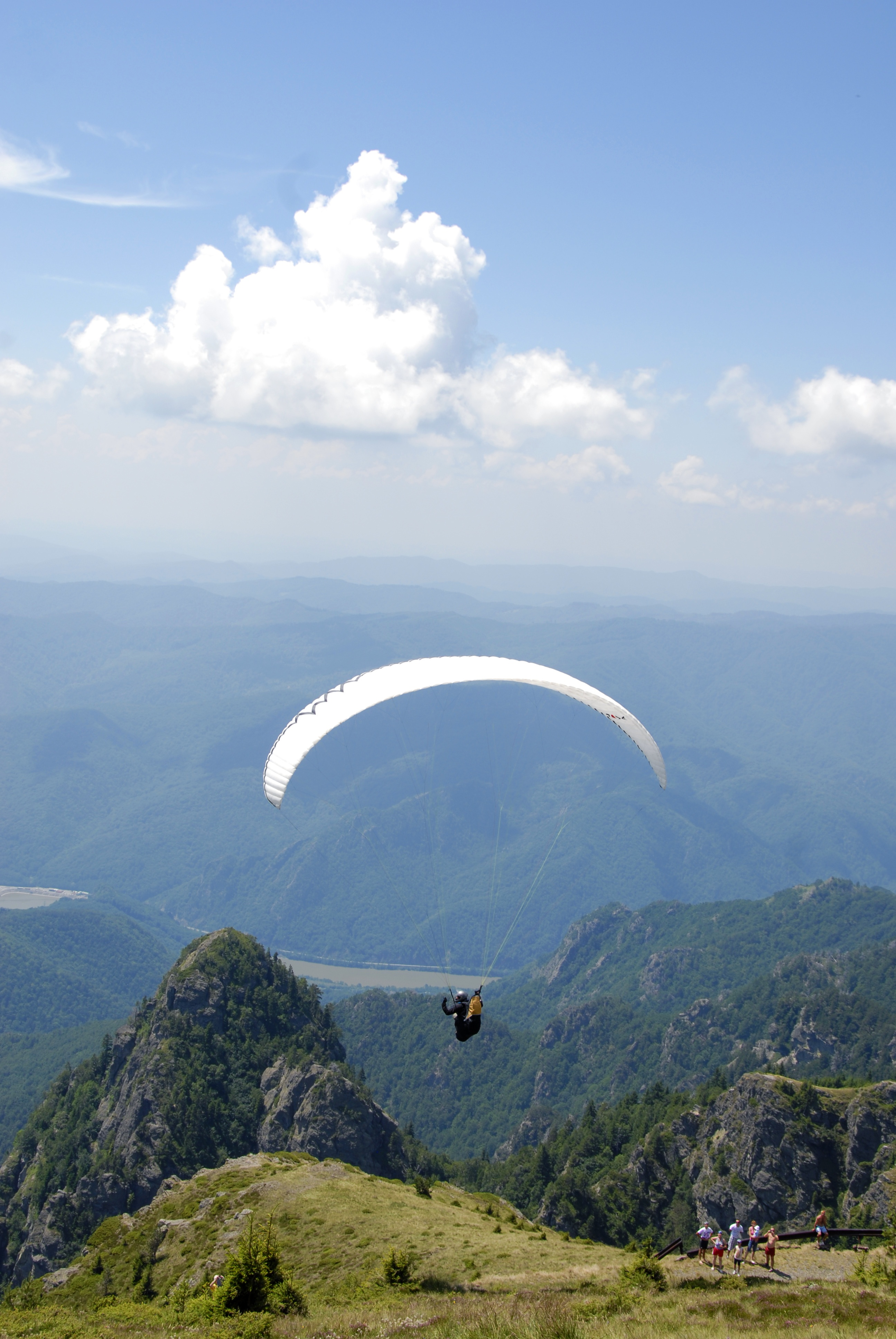
Mountainous landscape in Cozia National Park, Vâlcea County

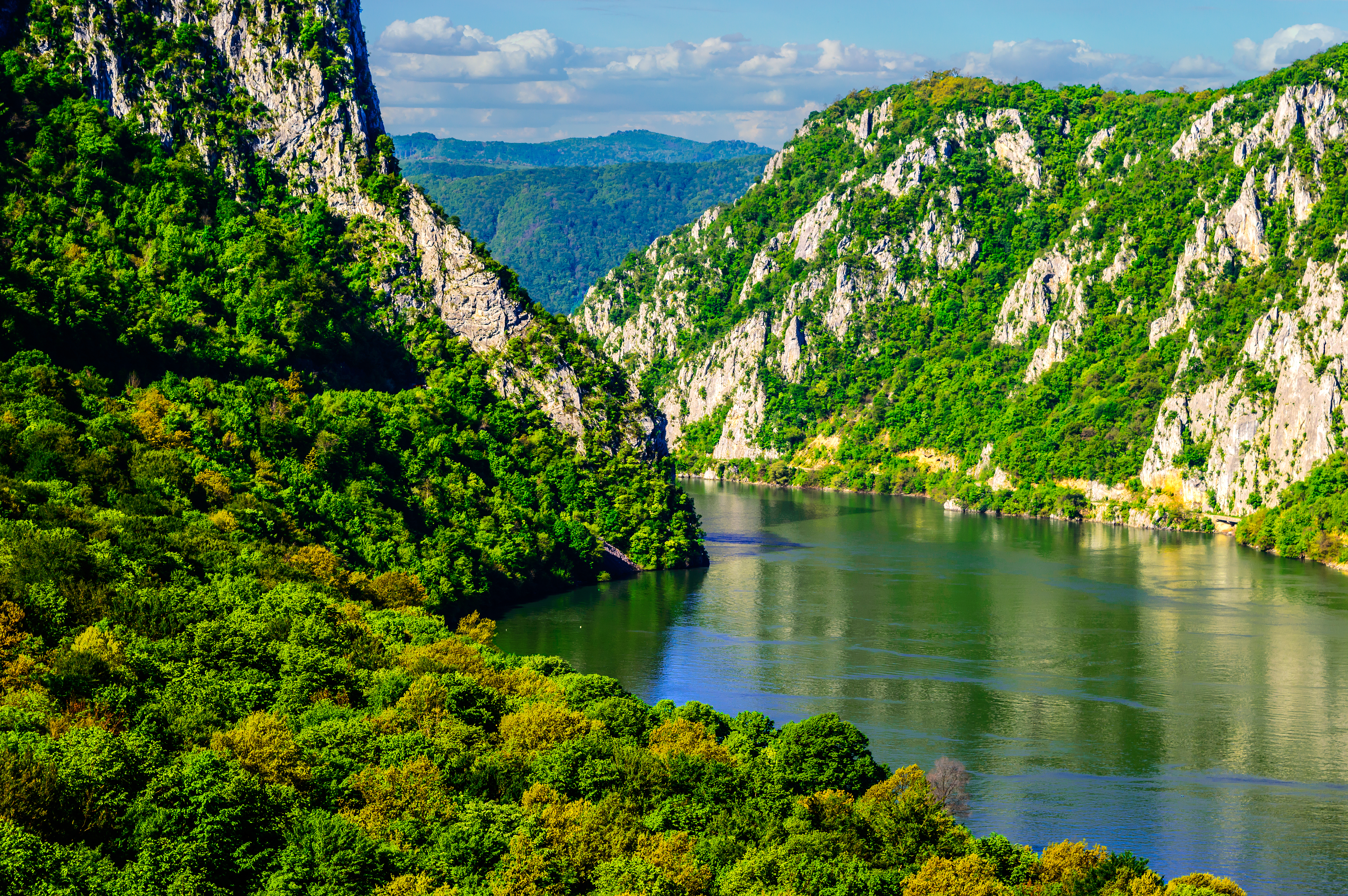
Iron Gates, (Danube Gorge)

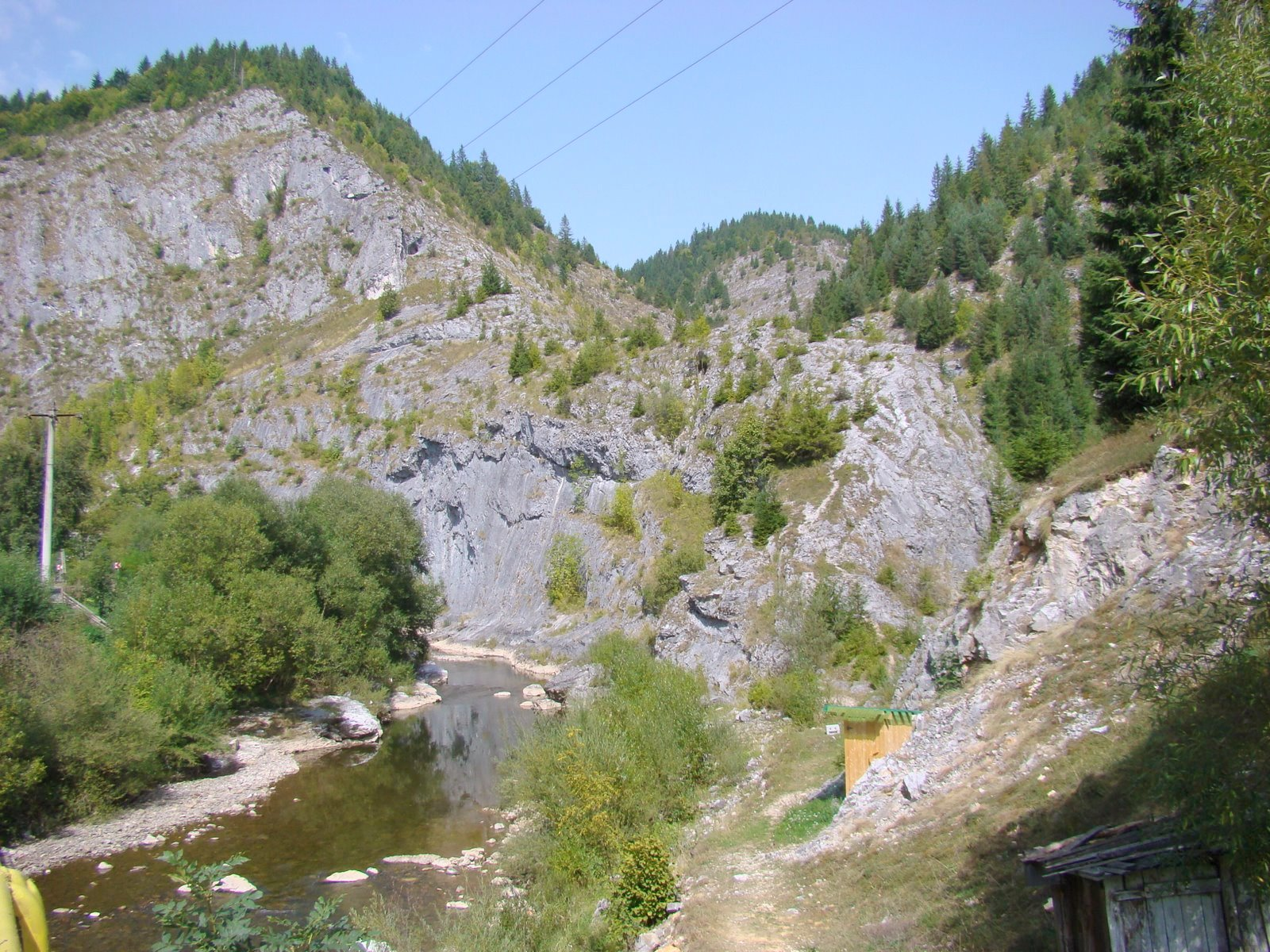
Arieșul Mare near Scărișoara in Apuseni Natural Park

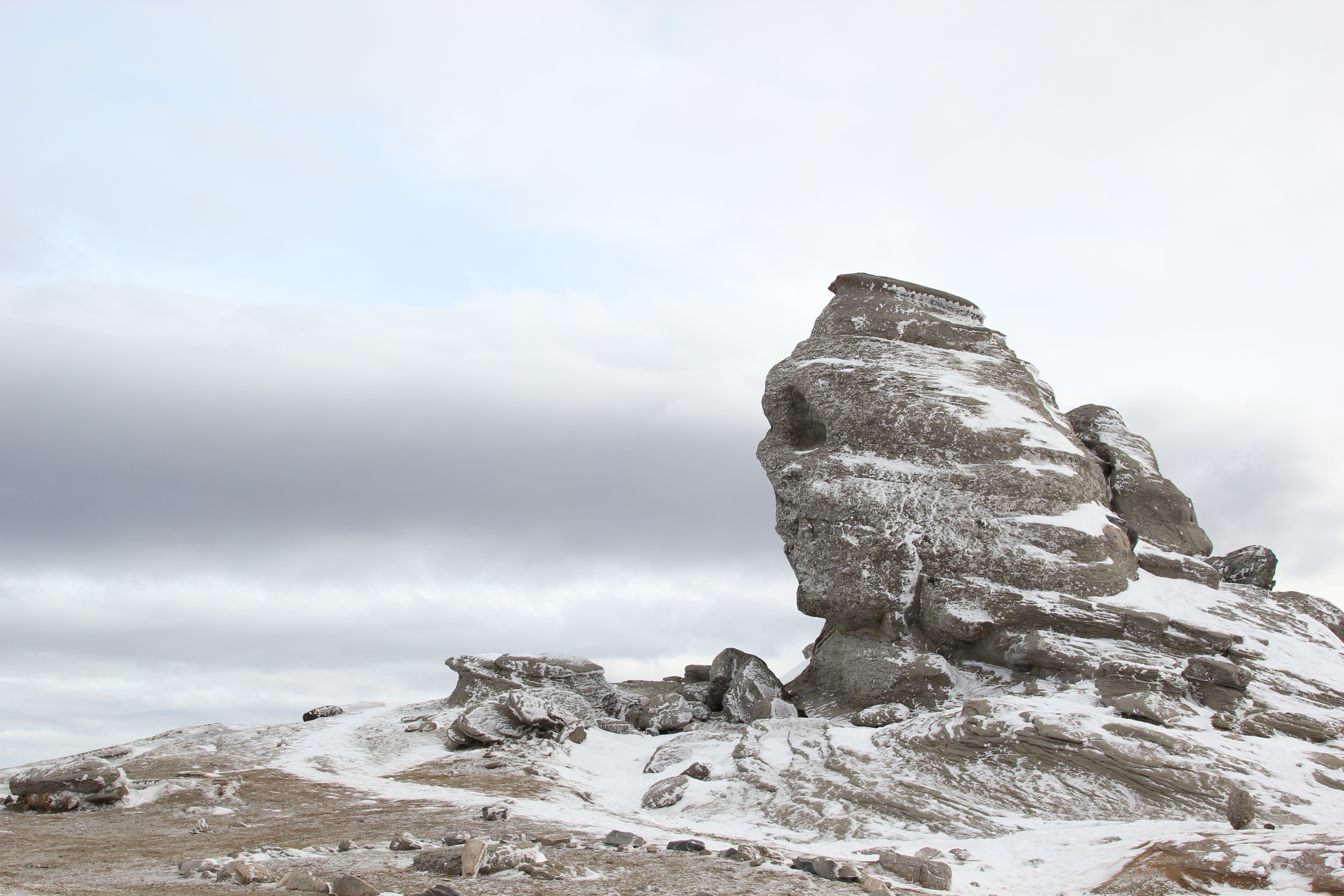
The Sphinx of Bucegi Mountains

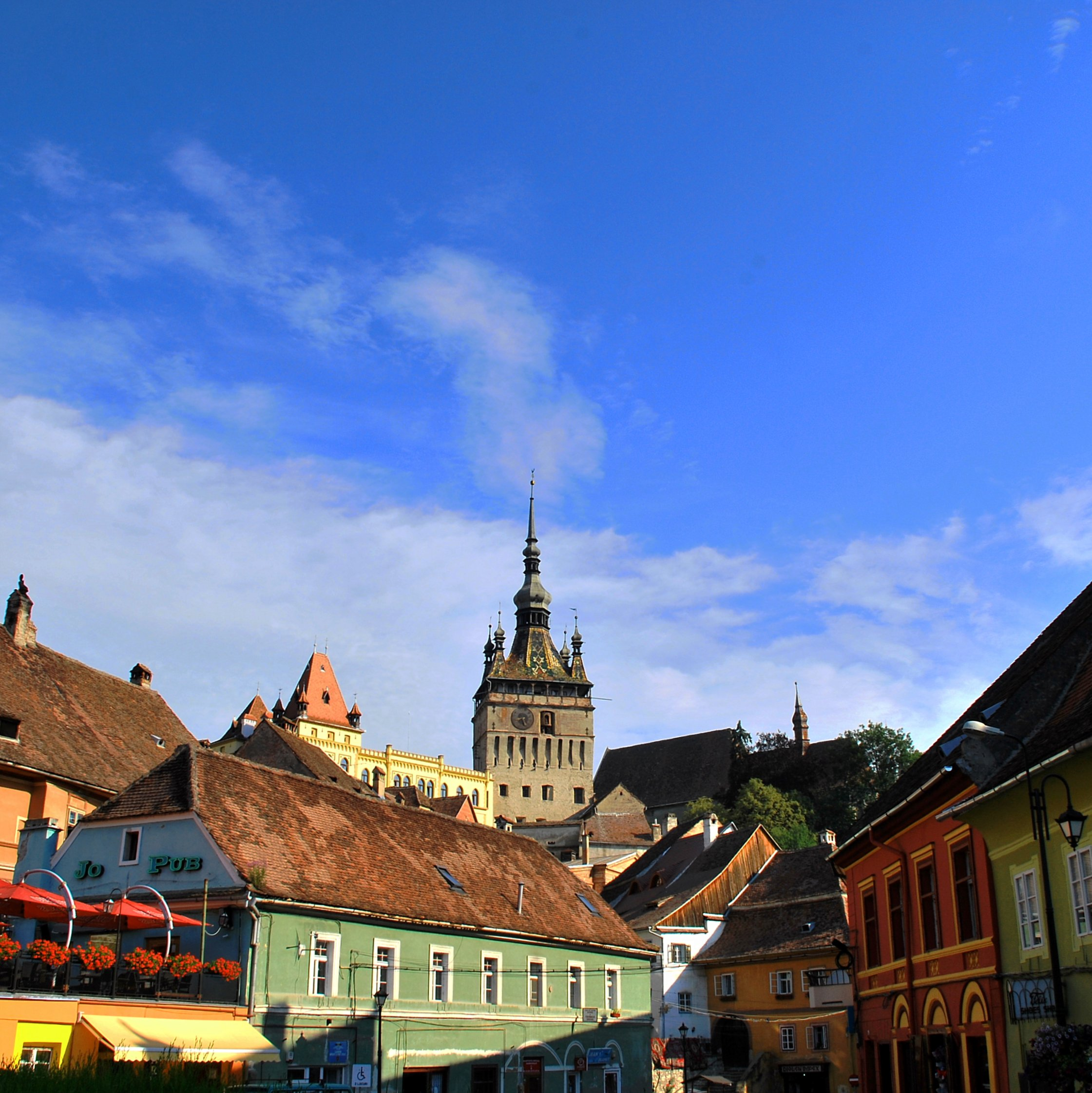
A part of the old town of Sighișoara, Mureș County

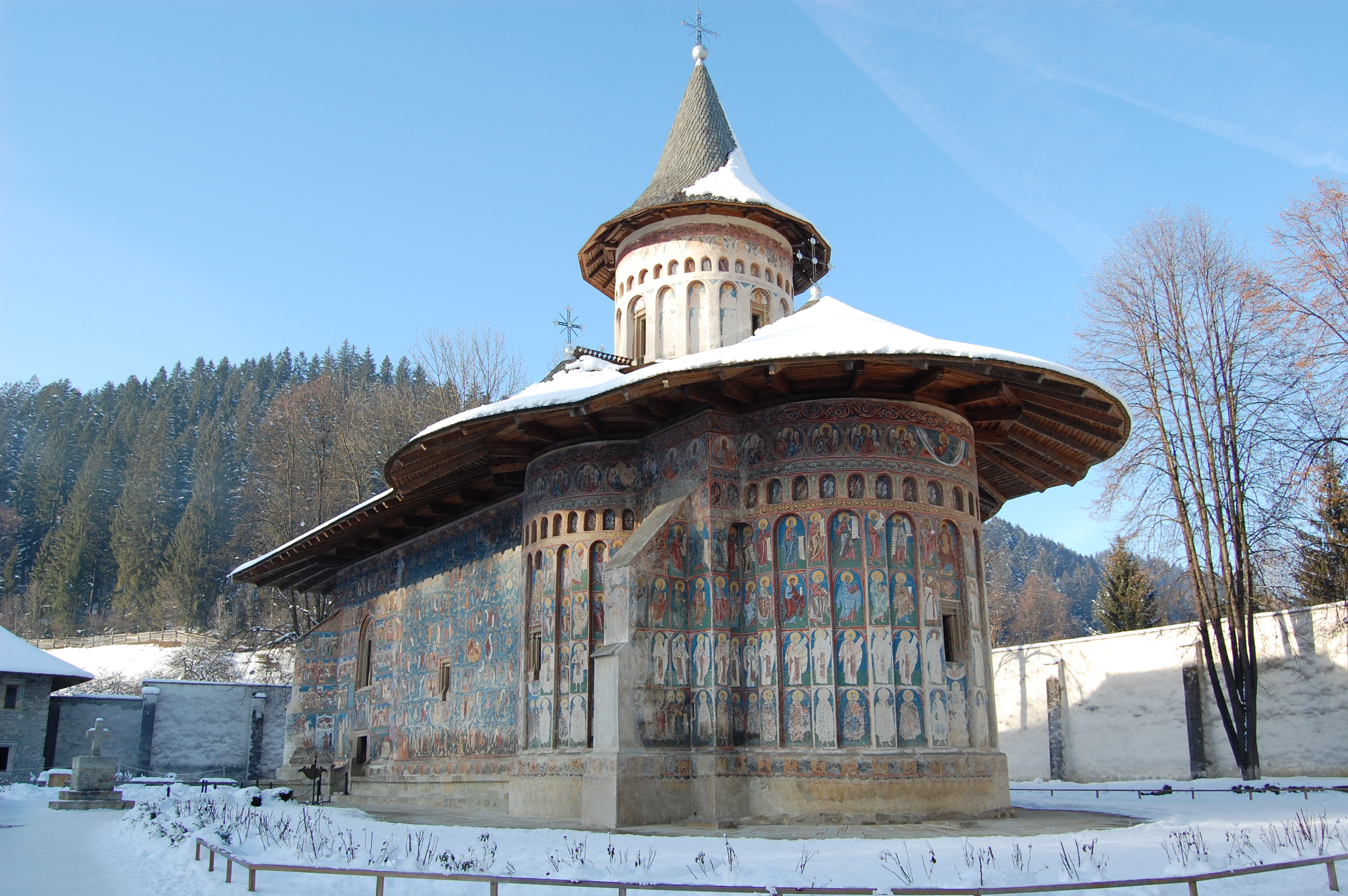
Voroneț Monastery

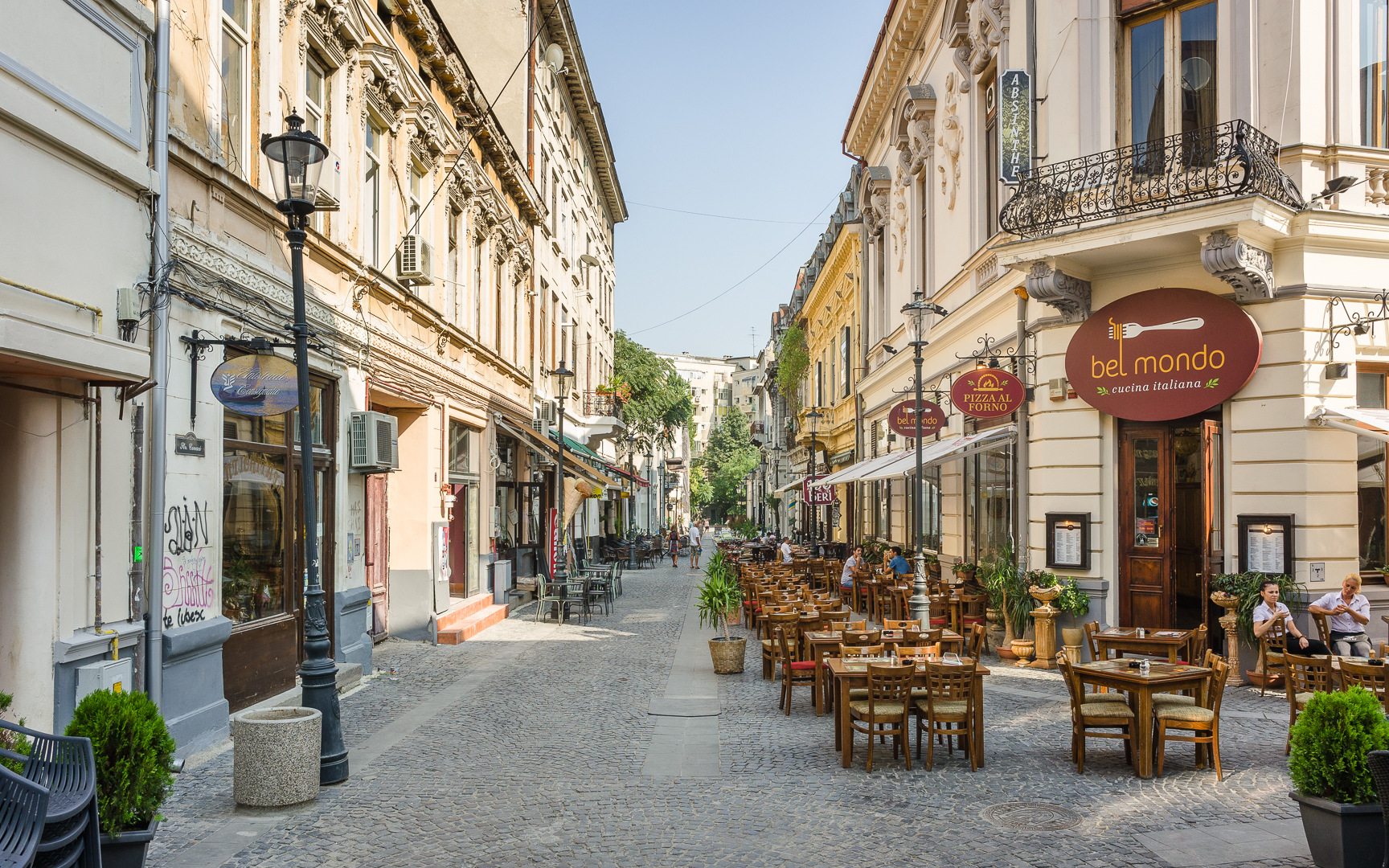
A part of Lipscani street in Bucharest's old town

The Palace of the Parliament in Bucharest

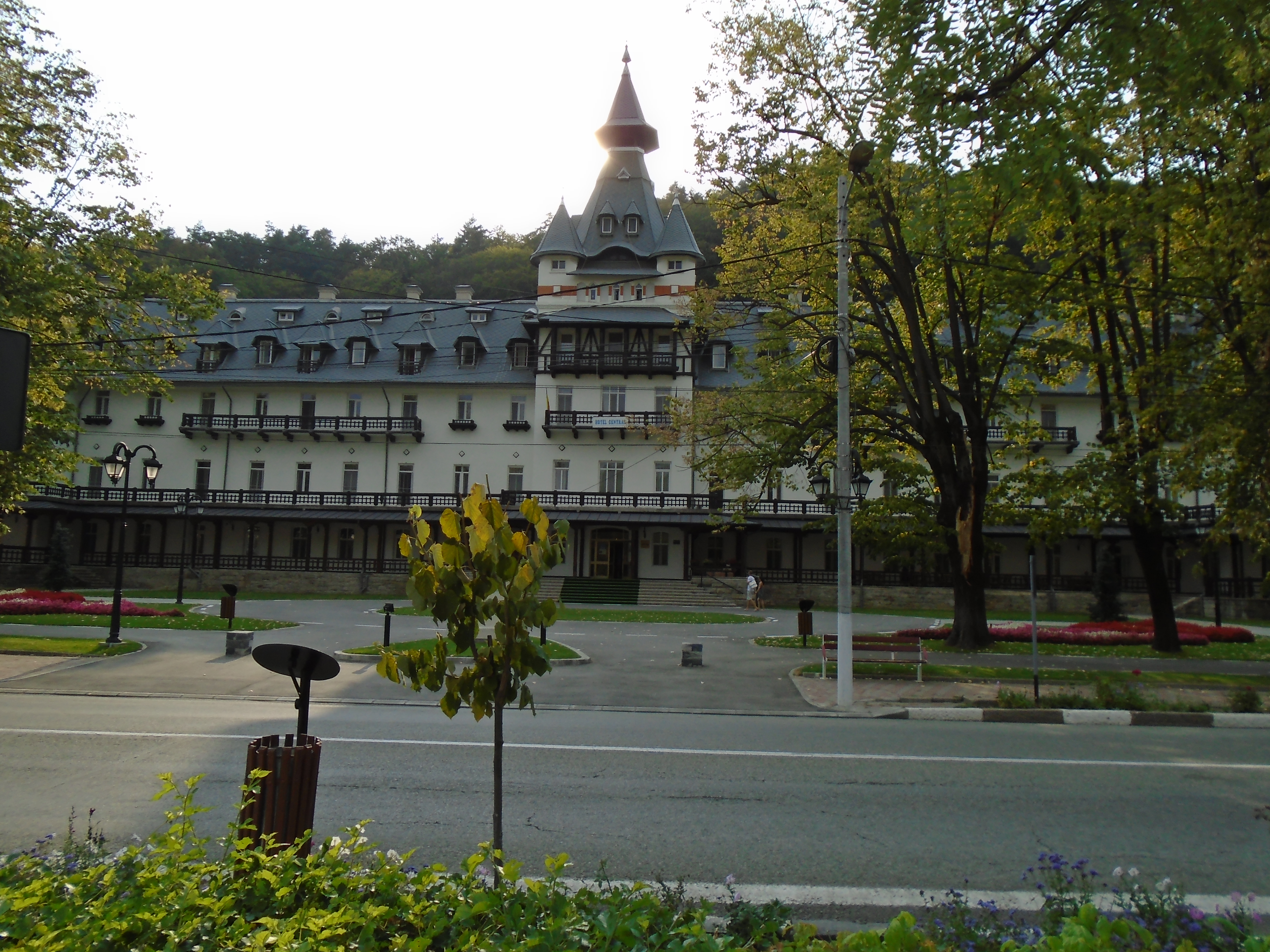
Călimănești

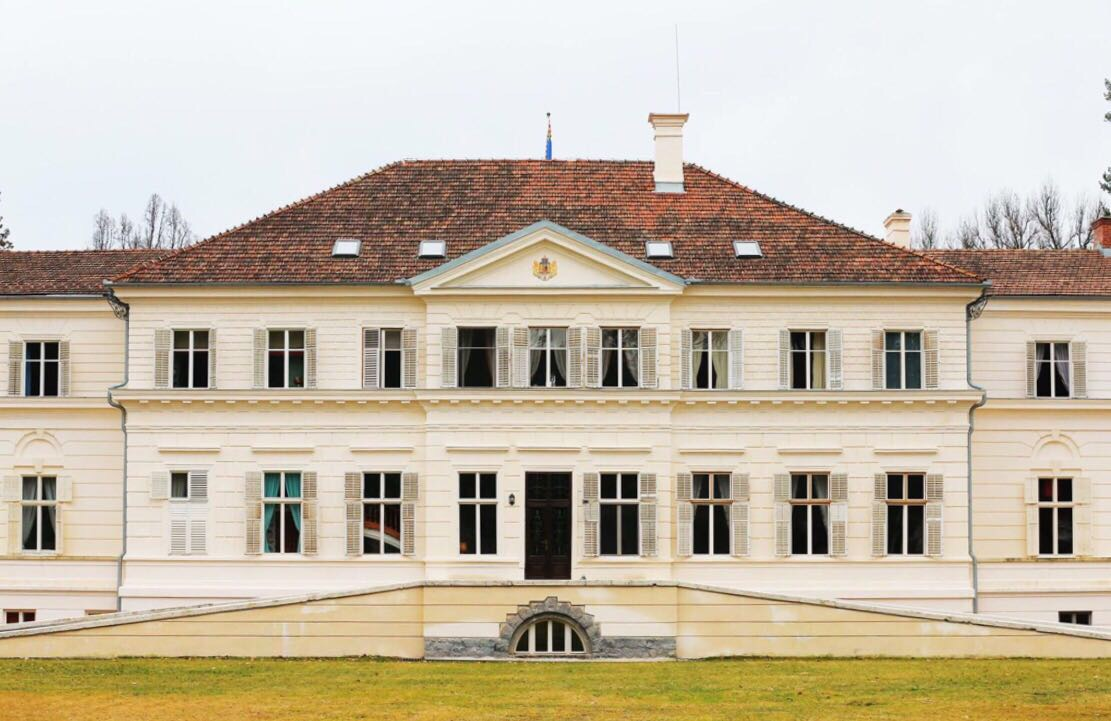
Săvârșin Royal Castle

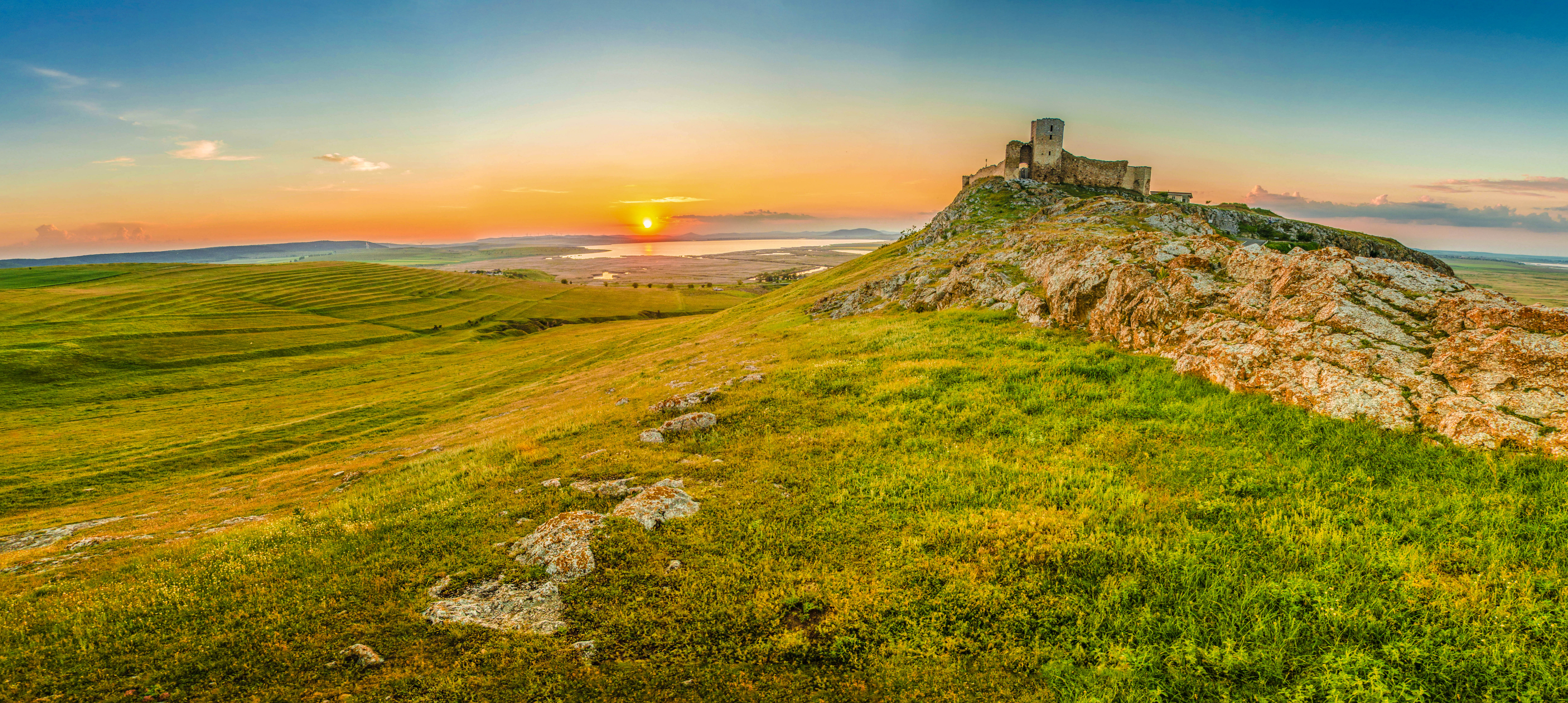
Enisala Citadel

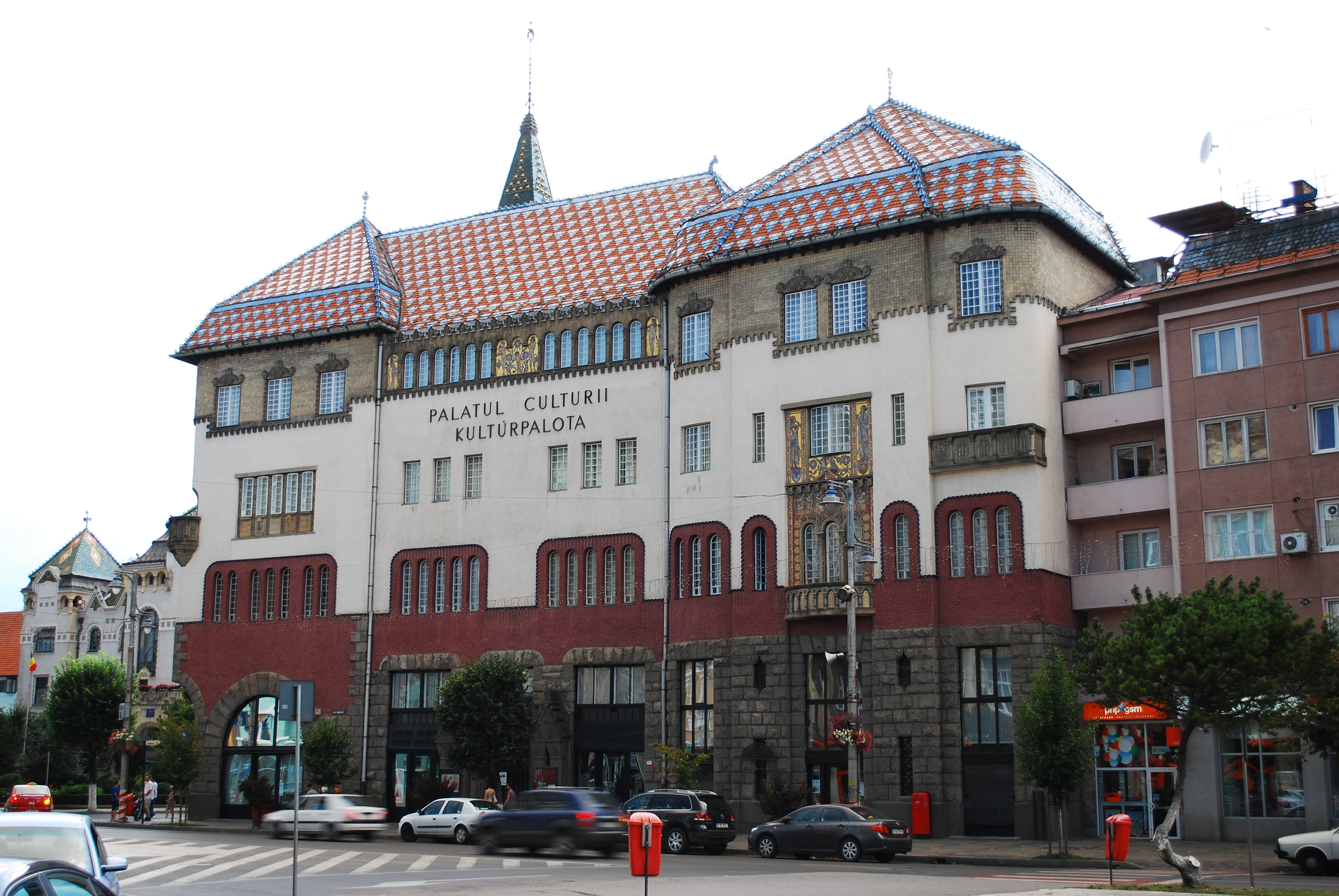
Târgu Mureș

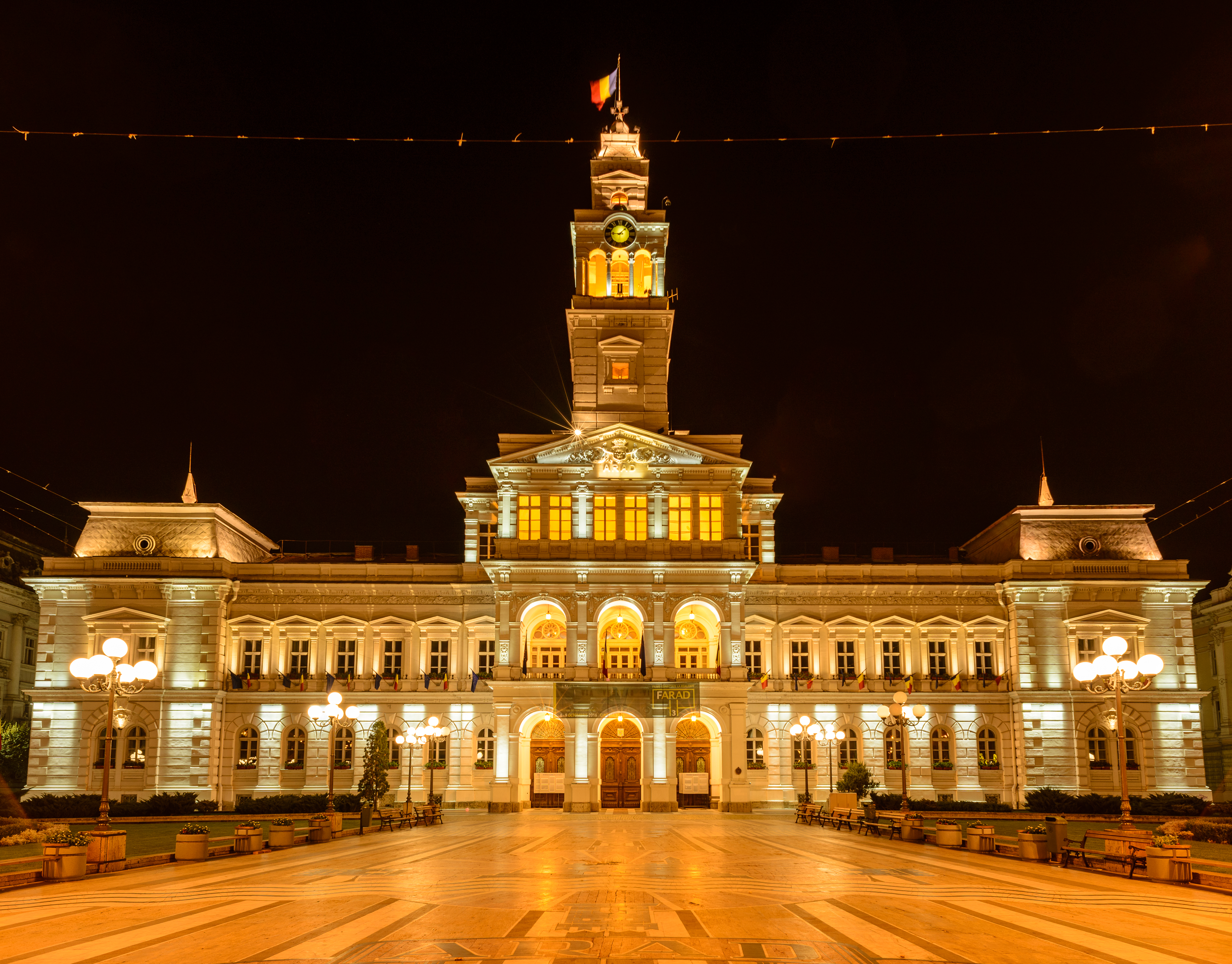
Arad

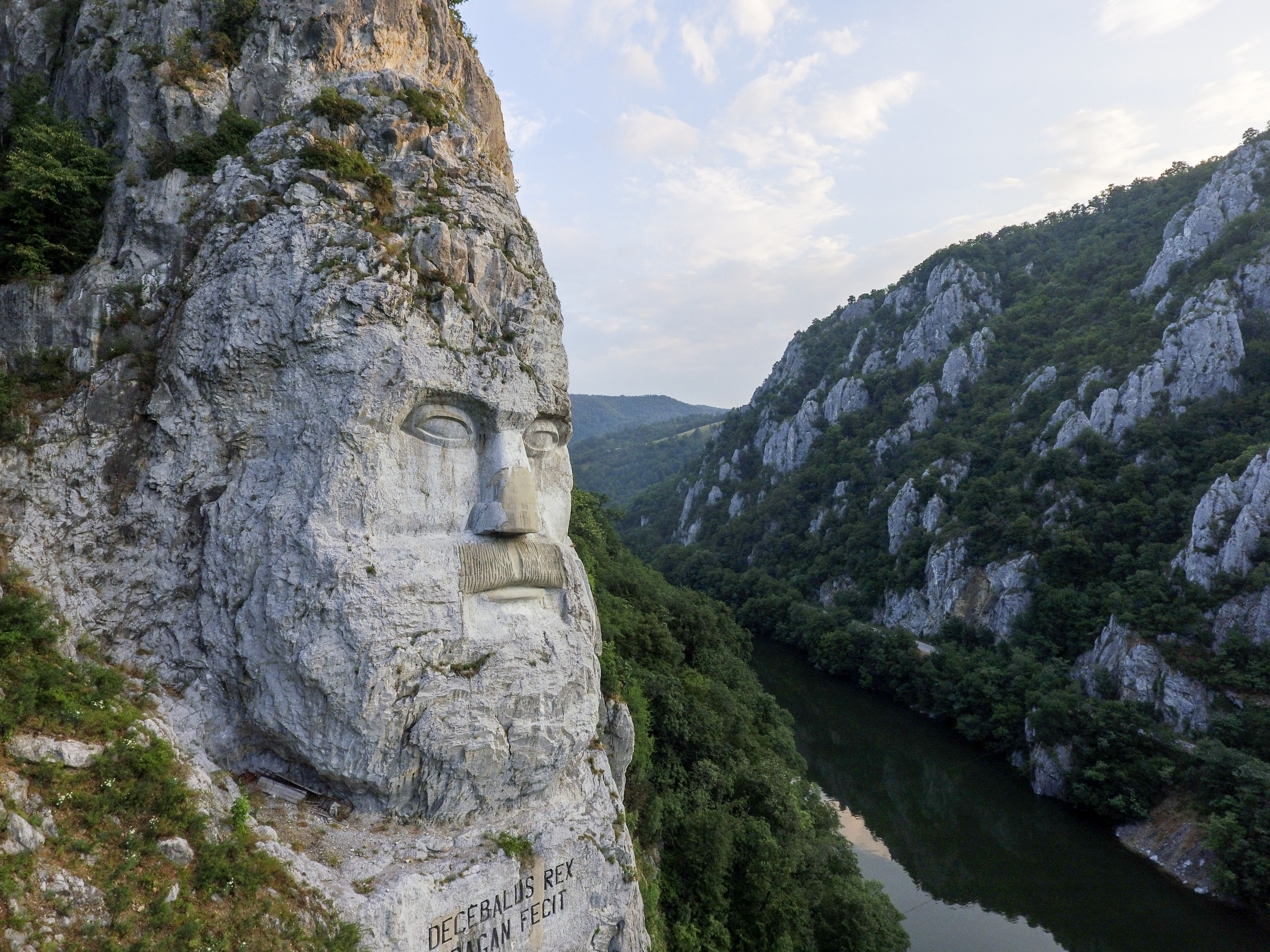
Rock sculpture of Decebalus

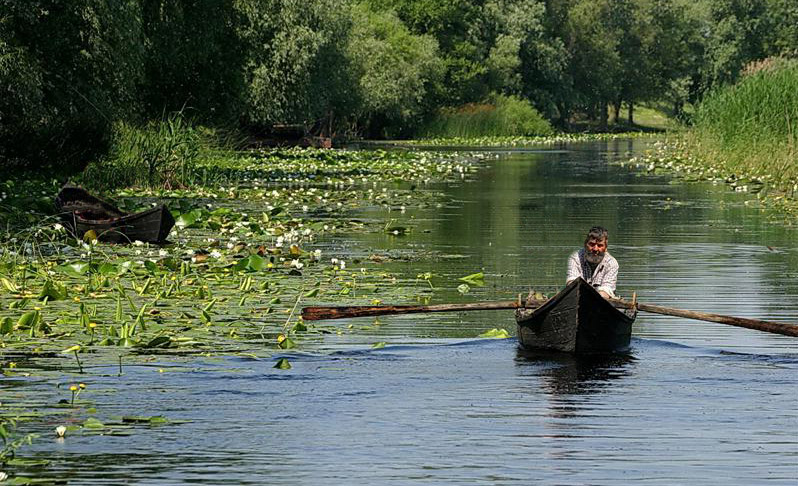
Danube Delta

== Festivals ==
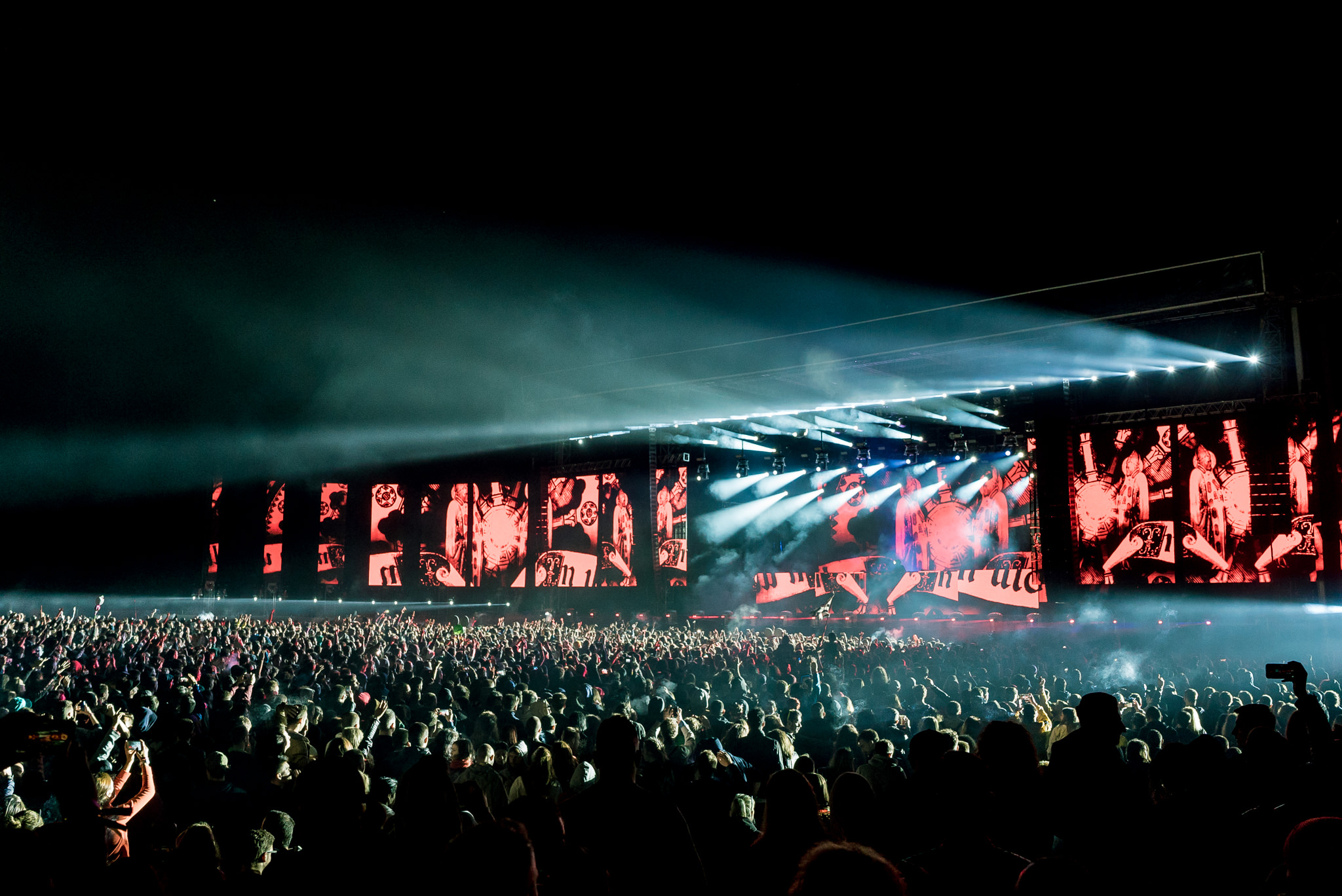
Electric Castle Festival in 2017

- George Enescu Festival, in Bucharest
- EUROPAfest Jazz festival in Bucharest
- Gărâna Jazz Festival in Caraș-Severin
- Revolution Festival in Timișoara
- Peninsula / Félsziget Festival in Târgu Mureș
- Golden Stag Festival, in Brașov
- Callatis Festival, in Mangalia
- Electric Castle Festival, in Bonțida Bánffy Castle near Cluj-Napoca
- Transilvania International Film Festival in Cluj-Napoca
- Untold Festival, in Cluj-Napoca – Romania's biggest music festival
- Rockstadt Extreme Fest, in Râșnov largest metal festival in Romania
- Neversea Festival, in Constanta
- SAGA Festival, in Bucharest
- International Theatre Festival in Sibiu
- Sighișoara Medieval Festival

== Statistics ==
Yearly tourist arrivals in thousands

=== Foreign visitors by country ===
Most visitors arriving to Romania in 2022 and 2024 were from the following countries:

Rank	Country	2024	2022
1	Ukraine	3,911,617	3,292,747
2	Moldova	2,655,656	2,607,301
3	Bulgaria	1,599,868	1,538,805
4	Hungary	1,267,033	864,546
5	Turkey	715,973	728,255
6	United Kingdom	323,975	231,741
7	Poland	247,683	235,485
8	Germany	227,478	379,910
9	Italy	224,541	403,485
10	United States	118,349	173,334
11	France	93,455	195,619
12	Austria	81,657	98,571
13	Greece	69,667	93,196
14	Spain	52,903	115,730
15	Slovakia	46,468	44,697
16	Czech Republic	45,722	46,390
17	Ireland	41,214	37,447
18	Netherlands	39,404	77,431
19	Portugal	33,651	41,095
20	Belgium	33,306	66,121
21	Canada	24,687	49,693
22	Croatia	24,535	22,732
23	Sweden	22,545	41,991
24	Cyprus	20,564	14,071
25	Australia	15,788	11,690
26	Lithuania	14,213	15,788
27	Denmark	10,754	23,403
28	Latvia	9,725	10,589
29	Slovenia	8,168	8,270
30	Finland	6,800	10,282
31	Estonia	4,194	5,135
32	New Zealand	3,410	2,462
33	Malta	2,095	3,757
34	Luxembourg	1,231	2,599
Total foreign		13,352,940	12,696,800

== Facilities for disabled travellers ==
Facilities for disabled travellers in Romania range from patchy to nonexistent. Anyone with mobility problems should go prepared and ideally have local contacts. Although it has made some slow strides towards disabled access since then, and new buildings need to be wheelchair-accessible, implementation has been very poor. In practice Romania remains by and large off-limits to disabled travellers.

== Industrial and creative tourism ==
Industrial tourism, as a niche of tourism in Romania and as a solution to the restructuring and disappearance of former large industrial sites (mining, metallurgy, heavy industry), takes on interest in the country still slowly, despite the country's join to the European Union in 2007. Even if presently the country is confronted with a long and difficult economic transition, it has a rich industrial and scientific history with many of the world's priorities and still has surviving authentic traditional crafts and rural communities. Limited to some geographic areas and not yet on a large scale, by the means of European funds and projects, a sustainable revival of the traditional sector is supported, which also implies creative tourism participatory activities.

Against it's potential, there are relatively few entities, the majority being state owned, that are organizing, providing or permitting public visits. The tourism stakeholders pay a relatively weak attention to the hard core of this niche (industrial heritage, technique, science and living industry), and there are not many package offers like this on the market, with some exceptions: ethnographic and wine tourism, also some rehabilitated industrial and forest narrow railways and steam engines still operating.

=== Primary attractions ===
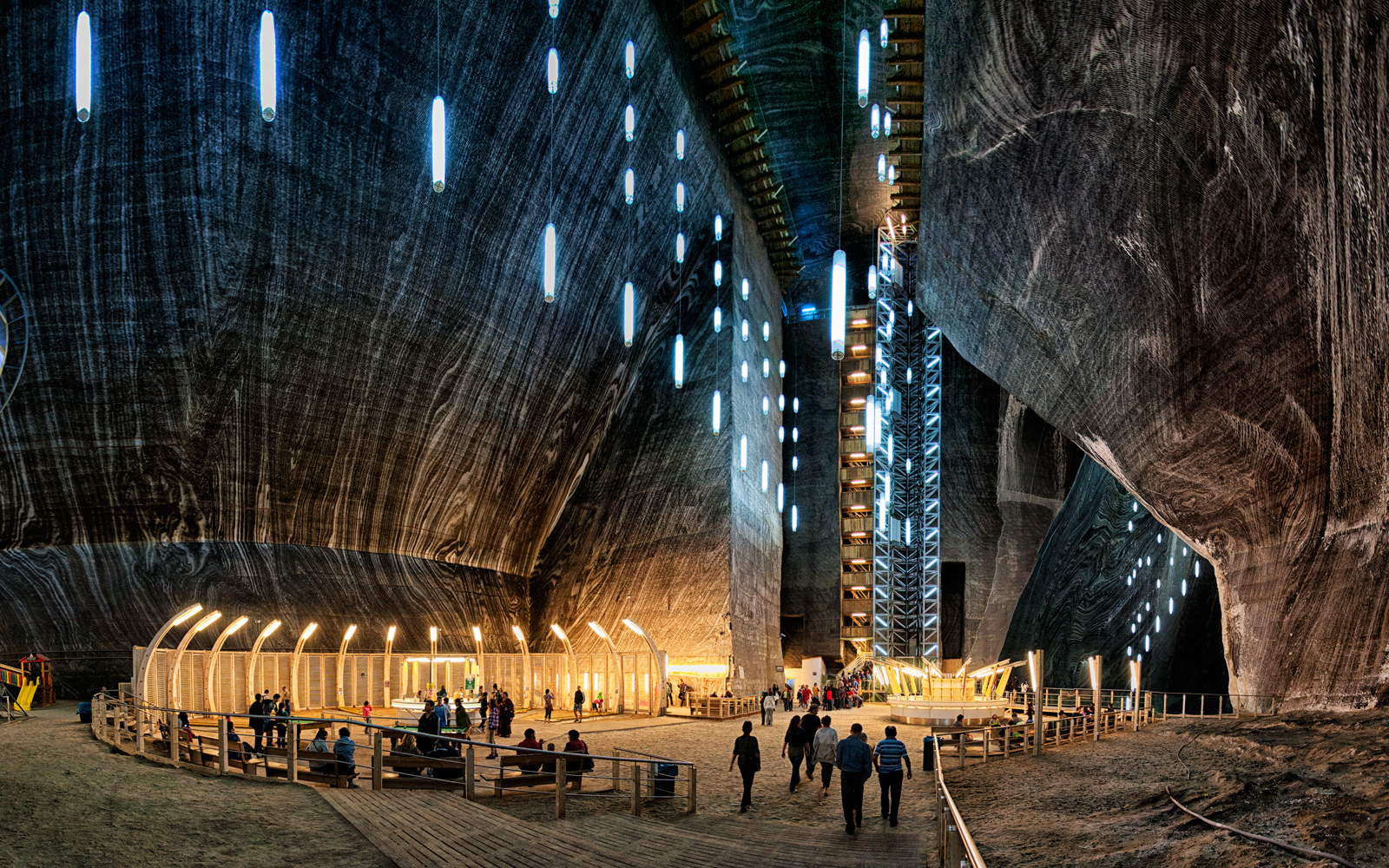
Turda Salt Mine

According, an industrial and creative tourism attractions web directory for Romania and some neighbouring countries, providing photos and short English descriptions of each objective, the main attractions open to the public are:

- the national and regional technical and ethnographic museums: the Dimitrie Leonida National Technical Museum and the Aviation Museum in Bucharest, the mining museums in Brad, Petrosani, Rosia Montana, a technical museum in Iasi, the tram museum in Timișoara, the Oil Museum in Ploiesti, the astronomic observatories in Bucharest and Bacau, the village museums from Bucharest, Pitesti, Sibiu, Cluj, Timișoara, Valcea, Suceava;
- the railway tourism on the recently rehabilitated narrow gauges from Brad, Abrud, Covasna, Moldovita, Agnita, Vaser, the Oravita – Anina mountain railway opened in 1864;
- the power plant museums from Cernavoda (nuclear), Iron Gates (hydro, on the Danube, 2200 MW, the biggest in European Union), Sadu (hydro, built in 1896), Sinaia (hydro, built in 1899), Grebla – Resita (hydro, built in 1904);
- factory tours: exception making some food (chocolate, soft drinks, yogurt) factories which provide visits for school children, there are no important companies (car, manufacturing, porcelain, textile, high technology, etc.) to promote such tourist visits. However, some reference enterprises may accept visits at special requests (the Resita Works, metallurgy, heavy machinery, founded in 1771, having a very interesting museum too, The Ruschita Marble Exploitation). A remarkable visit program, started in October 2013, offers the Timisoreana brewery, a factory founded in 1718, with very valuable heritage;
- industrial heritage: even if valuable, a large majority of the monuments are still abandoned by their owners. However, a few exceptions could be mentioned;
- motorsports: despite the missing of an international standard infrastructure like raceways, there are national federations organizing events for many categories and racing schools offering participatory courses;
- the salt mines from: Turda, Praid, Cacica, Slanic Prahova, Ocnele Mari, Ocna Sibiului (salt lakes) are equally famous for their tourism interest (museums, underground entertainment parks) as well as therapeutic exploitation (respiratory diseases)
- traditional crafts: wood carving, weaving, pottery, glass, embroidery. Many craftsmen preserved the traditions in some village areas from Moldavia, Transylvania and Oltenia. The majority are only selling their products on local markets, but they begin to organize and a few open their workshops to the tourists too;
- wineries: some vineyards have incredible landscapes and the wines produced here have a well established and long tradition. Wine tourism provides presentations of the technologies and the storage caves, and is well developed in Romania. Famous big wineries: Murfatlar, Cotnari, Dragasani, Recaș, Prahova Valley, Odobesti, Husi, Cricova (near Chisinau, in the Republic of Moldova, is huge, with about 80 kilometres of tunnels and caves)

== Infrastructure ==
There are 16 international commercial airports in service today. Overall, airports in the country were transited in 2016 by 16.4 million passengers. The largest number of passengers was attracted by Bucharest's Henri Coandă International Airport, which closed the year with a traffic of almost 11 million passengers.

Romania also has a large network of railways, CIA World Factbook lists Romania with the 22nd largest railway network in the world. The railway network is significantly interconnected with other European railway networks.

== See also ==
- UNESCO World Heritage Sites in Romania
- Castles in Romania
- Protected areas of Romania
- Transportation in Romania
- Aviation in Romania
- Seven Natural Wonders of Romania
- Seven Manmade Wonders of Romania
