= Stefan Lovin =

Romanian pianist and composer

Ștefan Lovin
- Born: February 21, 1980 (age 46); Tulcea, Romania
- Genres: Classical, Jazz, Contemporary
- Occupations: Pianist, Composer
- Instrument: Piano
- Years active: 2005–present

Ștefan Lovin (born 21 February 1980) is a Romanian pianist and composer based in Bucharest, Romania.

== Life and career ==
Lovin was born in Tulcea. Lovin studied at the Liceul de Arte "George Georgescu" in Tulcea and later at the National University of Music Bucharest, where he completed a degree in musical pedagogy at the Faculty of Composition, Musicology and Musical Pedagogy and a master's degree in piano performance. During his pedagogy studies he worked with composer and conductor Valentin Gruescu and was a member of the Orthodox Choir "Sf. Apostol Andrei" under the same conductor, gaining extensive experience with Romanian choral repertoire.

In 2005, Lovin received wider attention at the Sibiu Jazz Festival, where he presented original compositions that incorporated prepared piano techniques together with elements of contemporary music and modern jazz. Later the same year he appeared at the Bucharest Jazz Festival, giving the Romanian premiere of Chick Corea's "La Fiesta" in a solo-piano version based on the composer's 1978 improvisation. In 2006 he participated in the EUROPAfest gala at the Romanian Athenaeum, presenting his own orchestration of the jazz standard "Be My Love" by Nicholas Brodszky performed with the Romanian String Orchestra under conductor Alexandru Ganea. Further appearances included the 2008 Contemporary Music Festival, where he performed Silvia Macovei's "Astral Citadels", and a 2015 solo project titled "Reimagining Bach" that combined improvisation with interpretations of Johann Sebastian Bach's preludes.

In 2016 he gave a recital at Teatrelli Hall in Bucharest in duet with Italian jazz singer Stefano Latteri. Between 2016 and 2019 he collaborated with singer Lorena Oltean in the project "Echoes of Romania", which explored connections between Romanian folk traditions and classical sonorities.

From around 2019 onward Lovin concentrated primarily on solo classical-piano recitals spanning works from Bach to Dmitri Shostakovich. In December 2020 he performed Book I of Bach's The Well-Tempered Clavier at Palatul Mogoșoaia.

In December 2020 he presented the project Romanian Carols in Piano Resonance (Colinde românești în rezonanța pianului), featuring his adaptations and reinterpretations of twelve traditional Romanian Christmas carols, at concert halls of the Sibiu and Brașov Philharmonics. A review of the 19 December 2020 performance at Sibiu's Thalia Hall described a carefully staged recital that blended folk material with contemporary piano writing in an intimate pre-Christmas chamber setting. In July 2021 he performed a solo recital at the Romanian-American Festival organised by the Sibiu State Philharmonic, including his own piano transcription of George Enescu's Prelude à l’unisson. Additional recitals included a December 2022 performance at Casa Balș (Sala Eduard Caudella) in Iași, organised by the National University of Arts "George Enescu", and a July 2023 concert at Muzeul Casa Mureșenilor in Brașov. In 2023 he contributed to the "Easter Lights" (Lumini Pascale) project at the Sibiu Philharmonic with a recital that reinterpreted Romanian Orthodox choral works and Gregorian chants for solo piano (later released as the live album Imagining Christ).

Lovin has released several solo-piano albums that incorporate Romanian folk material, jazz improvisation and classical repertoire. These include The Poet of the Sea (2022) and Traditional Romanian Songs (Live) (2025).
