= List of festivals in Romania =

This is a list of festivals in Romania.

== By type ==
=== Music ===
==== Jazz, Rock, Electronic ====
| Name | Location | Style | Description |
|---|---|---|---|
| Gărâna Jazz Festival | Gărâna, Caraș-Severin | Jazz | ... |
| Artmania Festival | Sibiu | Rock | Transylvanian and Arts Festival – mainly Rock Music |
| Untold Festival | Cluj-Napoca | Electronic | Best Major European Festival in 2015 |

==== Classical ====
- George Enescu Festival
- Toamna Muzicală Clujeană

==== Others ====
- Beach, Please! Festival
- Electric Castle
- EUROPAfest – International festival of jazz, blues, pop and classical music
- Rockstadt Extreme Fest – Râșnov

=== Theatre ===
- Avram Goldfaden Festival – Iași
- FITS – International Theater Festival, Sibiu

=== Cinema ===
- Comedy Cluj, International Comedy Film Festival, Cluj-Napoca
- F-Sides – Feminist Film Festival, Bucharest
- Gay Film Nights – LGBT Film Festival, Cluj-Napoca
- Transilvania International Film Festival, Cluj-Napoca

=== Others ===
- Sighișoara Medieval Festival – Cultural (Medieval revival)

== See also ==
- List of music festivals
- List of festivals in Europe
