= Comedy Cluj =

International film festival in Romania

Coordinates: 46°46′N 23°35′E

- Location: Transylvania, Romania
- Language: International
- Website: www.comedycluj.ro

Comedy Cluj is an international film festival of comedy film organized annually in October in Cluj-Napoca, Transylvania, Romania.

== History ==
The first edition of Comedy Cluj was held in 2009 and comprised 70 films coming from 19 countries, as well as several workshops, street theater shows, conferences and parties. The festival includes competitive and non competitive sections.

Despite the late-2000s recession, Comedy Cluj had grown, so that its second edition (held in October 8–17, 2010) showed more than 100 films.

== See also ==
- List of film festivals in Europe
- List of film festivals in Romania

Film festivals in Cluj:

- Transilvania International Film Festival
- Gay Film Nights
