= Sighișoara Medieval Festival =

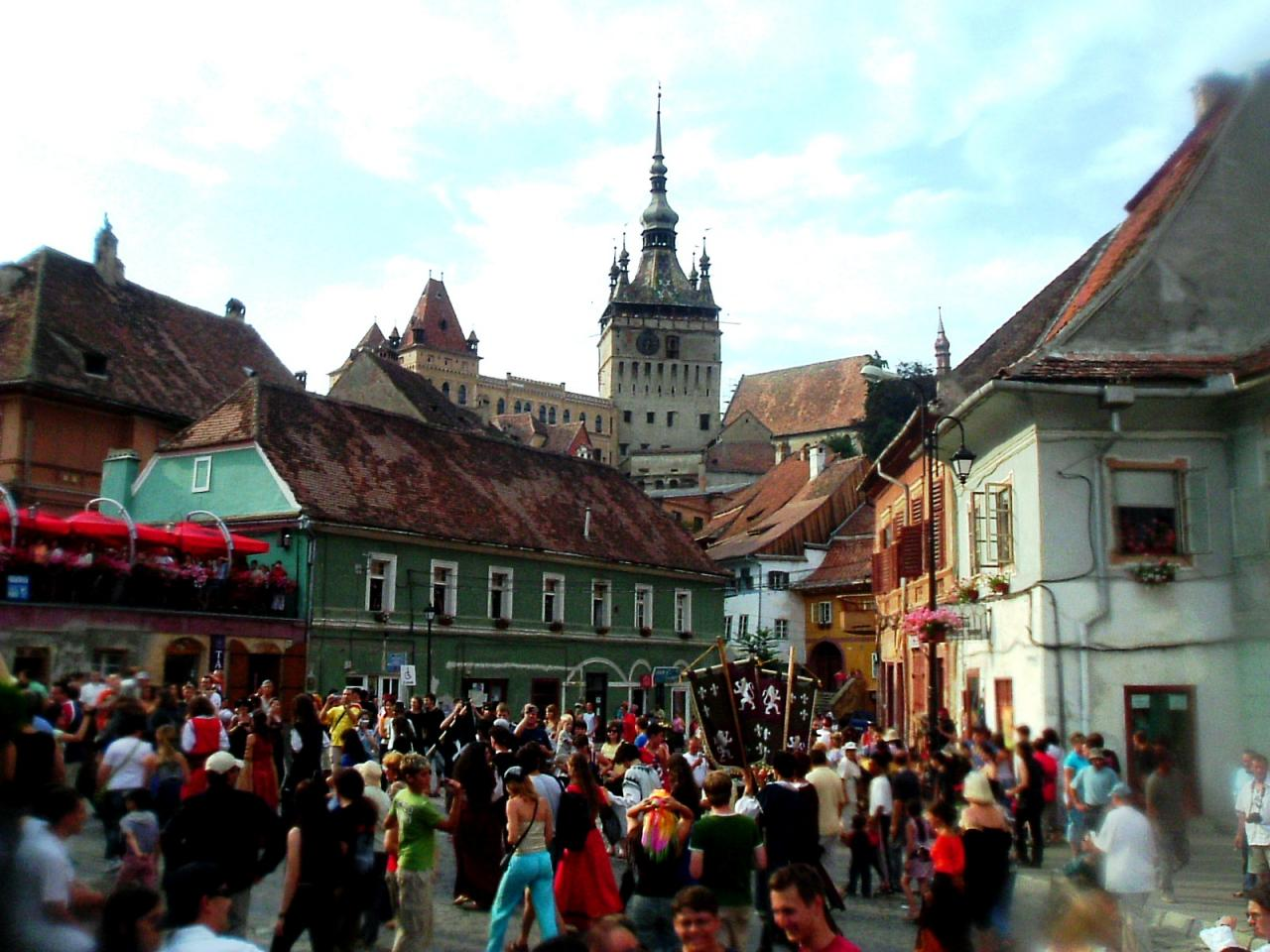
Festival in 2016

Sighişoara Medieval Festival or Festivalul Sighişoara medievală is a Romanian festival held on the last weekend of July in Sighişoara, Romania.

== At the parting of the ways ==
Knights Market, Pilgrims Market, Mercenaries Square, Troubadours Square, Small Knights Square, officials Great Tribune, Columnist House, Blacksmith Tower, Craftsman Road, Singer and Actors Road, Ancestors Road, Witches Court, Comediant Road, Pilgrims Way, Gourmet Court, Court Fortress, Prisoners Corner.

== See also ==
- Festivals in Romania
- Sighişoara
