= Gărâna Jazz Festival =

Music festival in Gărâna, Romania

- Genre: Jazz
- Dates: July
- Locations: Gărâna (Caraș-Severin), Banat, southwestern Romania
- Years active: 1997–present
- Website: www.garana-jazz.ro

Gărâna Jazz Festival (Romanian: Festivalul de jazz de la Gărâna) is a four day music festival taking place annually in July in Gărâna, southwestern Romania. The Festival launched in 1996 and in the intervening years has raised the profile of Gărâna, a small village in the Western Carpathians. The festival has featured an impressive lineup of high-class artists — including Eberhard Weber, Mike Stern, Jan Garbarek, Charles Lloyd, Jean-Luc Ponty, Victor Wooten, Béla Fleck, Stanley Jordan, John Abercrombie, Miroslav Vitouš (the original bassist of jazz fusion band Weather Report), Zakir Hussain, Magnus Öström, Bugge Wesseltoft, Lars Danielsson, Avishay Cohen, and Nils Petter Molvær.

== See also ==
- Jazz festivals in Romania
