= EUROPAfest =

- Design: Ana C. Dobrescu
- Genre: Jazz, blues, pop, classical
- Dates: May
- Locations: Bucharest, Romania
- Coordinates: 44°25′57″N 26°6′14″E
- Years active: 1993–present
- Website: europafest.ro

EUROPAfest is an international music festival held every May in Bucharest, Romania. The festival is the only one in Europe which presents four music genres in a single event: jazz, blues, pop, and classical music, bringing together bands and classical musicians from 45 countries. The festival includes competitions, workshops, master classes, jam sessions, and concerts.

== History ==
The festival concept started in 1993 and called Jeunesses Musicales International Festival. It hosted only classical music events, but the idea of the festival was changed in 2002. With the name EUROPAfest, three more music genres were added: jazz, blues and pop. In 2005 the festival came under the patronage of Princess Margarita and Prince Radu. Every year, the EUROPAfest brings more than 300 musicians from 45 countries.

== Activities ==
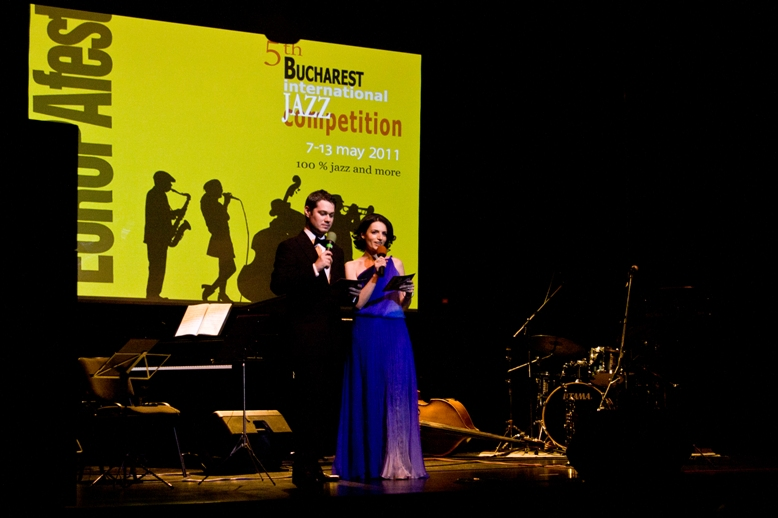
Bucharest International Jazz Competition

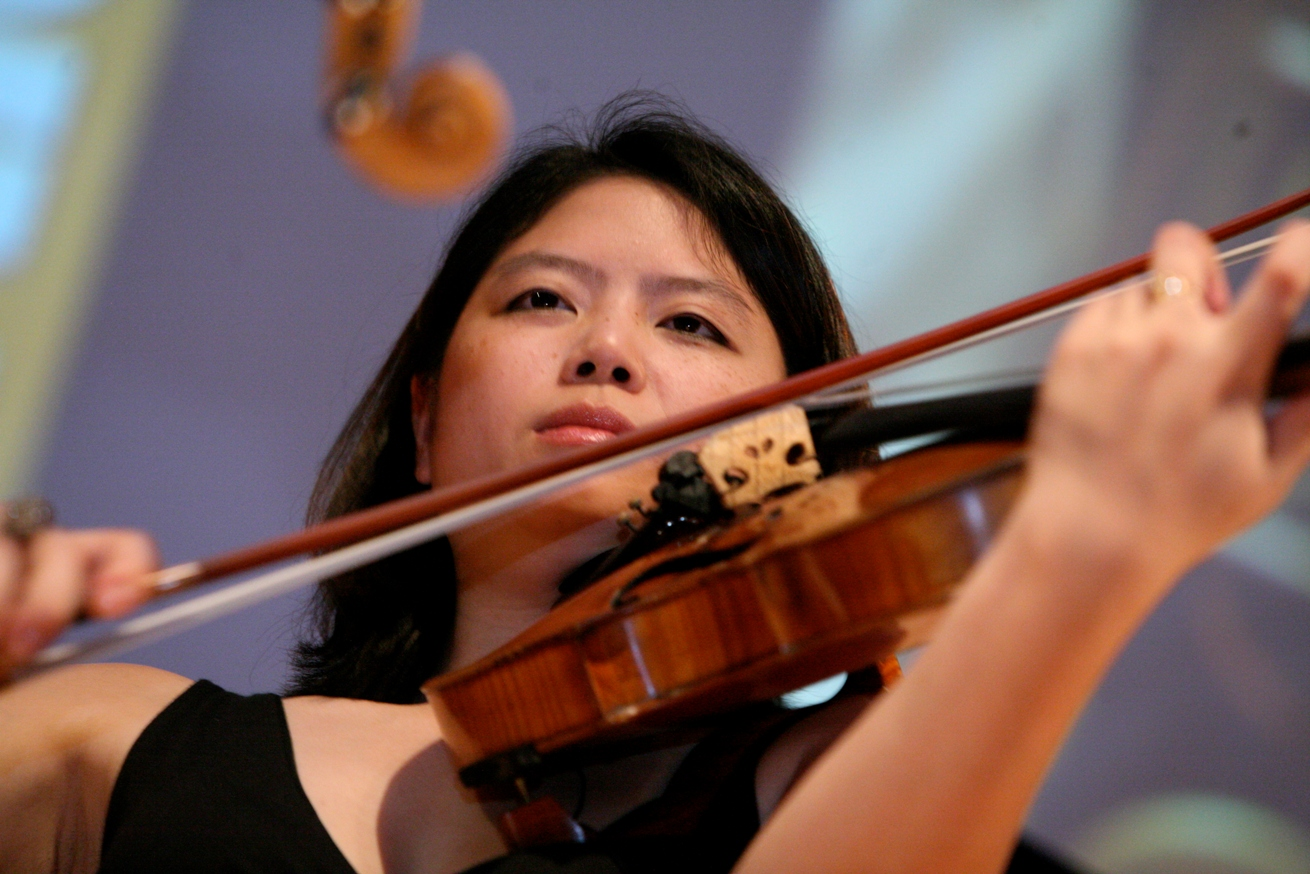
Jeunesses International Music Competition

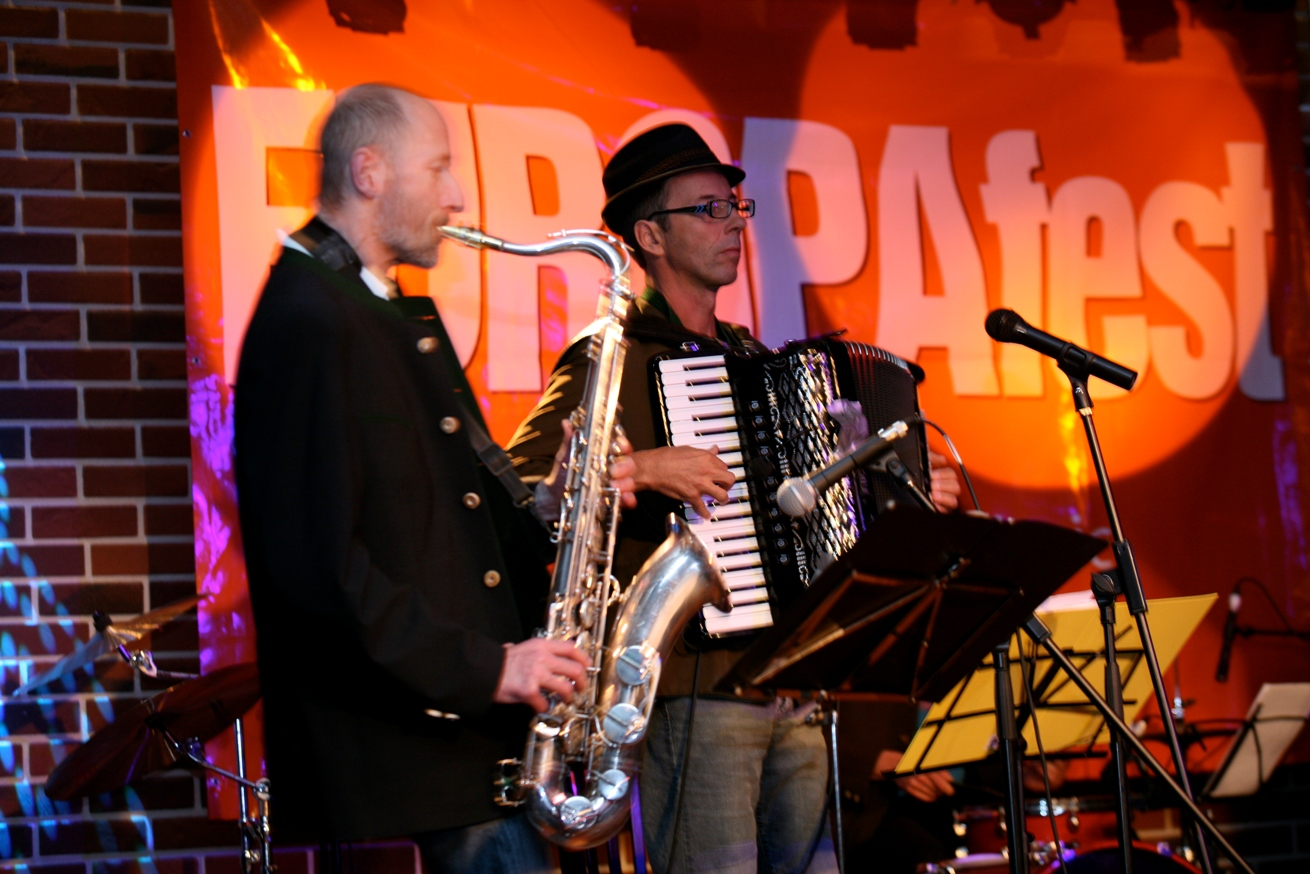
Caffe Festival

The first day is dedicated to celebrating Europe Day – with jazz, blues, pop, and classical music performed. Besides the European celebration, the Opening Gala includes performances by international artists, speeches by public and diplomatic personalities, and a presentation of the program for the following days. For the next days, the festival offers jazz, blues, and pop concerts performed by European musicians, both in traditional and unconventional concert venues. Jazz, blues, and pop concerts take place every day of the festival. National and international musicians perform in Bucharest.

Instrumentalists and vocalists up to the age of 35 participate in the Bucharest International Jazz Competition, playing jazz to the audience and to jury members On its last edition, the competition takes place in the Auditorium Hall in the Royal Palace and at the Art Center Tinerimea Romana, ArCub.

Jeunesses International Music Competition involves violin, flute, clarinet, piano and composition. It has three age categories up to the age of 30. Usually, the competition has around 100 musicians from 35–40 countries. The jury is made up of distinguished professors and international performers. The competition is followed by jam sessions and workshops under the guidance of international specialists. Jam sessions are organized between competitors and jazz musicians. Both jazz and classical musicians can attend workshop.

Caffe Festival introduces the idea of concerts in unconventional venues. Concerts of jazz, blues, or pop take place in pubs, clubs, coffee houses, or terraces. The Caffe Festival has been held in Hard Rock Cafe Bucharest, Clubul Taranului, and Cafe L'Estaminet.

EUROPAfest ends with the Gala, an evening when the best musicians of the festival perform and the public has the chance to find out the prize-winners of the contests. The night culminates with performances and jam sessions. The Royal House of Romania Diploma is given to a company which was a partner of the festival.

== See also ==
- List of jazz festivals
- Festivals in Romania
- List of classical music competitions
- List of music festivals
