= List of World Heritage Sites in Romania =

Location of World Heritage Sites within Romania. Green dots indicate the Beech Forest sites, yellow indicate the Dacian fortresses, blue indicate the villages with fortified churches, grey indicate the Wooden churches of Maramureș, and orange dots indicate the Churches of Moldavia. The sites of the Dacian Limes (277 components) are not shown.

The United Nations Educational, Scientific and Cultural Organization (UNESCO) World Heritage Sites are places of importance to cultural or natural heritage as described in the UNESCO World Heritage Convention, established in 1972. Cultural heritage consists of monuments (such as architectural works, monumental sculptures, or inscriptions), groups of buildings, and sites (including archaeological sites). Natural heritage consists of natural features (physical and biological formations), geological and physiographical formations (including habitats of threatened species of animals and plants), and natural sites which are important from the point of view of science, conservation, or natural beauty. Romania accepted the convention on 16 May 1990, making its historical sites eligible for inclusion on the list.

As of 2026, there are 11 World Heritage Sites in Romania, nine of which are cultural sites and two of which are natural. The first site in Romania, the Danube Delta, was added to the list at the 15th Session of the World Heritage Committee, held in Carthage in 1990. Further sites were added in 1993 and 1999 and some of the sites were subsequently expanded. Roșia Montană Mining Cultural Landscape was listed in 2021 and was immediately placed in the list of World Heritage in Danger due to plans to resume mining. The site Ancient and Primeval Beech Forests of the Carpathians and Other Regions of Europe is shared among 18 European countries. In addition, there are 19 sites on Romania's tentative list.

== World Heritage Sites ==
UNESCO lists sites under ten criteria; each entry must meet at least one of the criteria. Criteria i through vi are cultural, and vii through x are natural.

* Transnational site
† In danger

World Heritage Sites
Site	Image	Location	Year listed	UNESCO data	Description
Danube Delta	Dalmatian Pelican and Great Cormorant in the Danube Delta	Tulcea County	1991	588; vii, x (natural)	The Danube Delta, where the Danube river enters the Black Sea, is the largest European wetland. It is home to over 300 bird and 45 freshwater fish species, including the endangered sturgeons. Mammal species include European mink, European wildcat, Eurasian otter, and the threatened monk seal.
Villages with Fortified Churches in Transylvania	Church with surrounding walls and houses	Sibiu, Alba, Harghita, Brașov, and Mureș County	1993	596bis; iv (cultural)	This site comprises seven villages with fortified churches that were built between the 13th and the 16th centuries by Transylvanian Saxons. The settlement pattern and the organization of the villages has been preserved since the Middle Ages. The village of Biertan (the fortified church is pictured) was listed in the original nomination in 1993, while six villages (Câlnic, Dârjiu, Prejmer, Saschiz, Valea Viilor, and Viscri) were added in 1999.
Monastery of Horezu	A richly ornamented church building with two bell towers	Vâlcea County	1993	597; ii (cultural)	The monastery in the town of Horezu was founded in 1690 by Constantin Brâncoveanu, Prince of Wallachia, who was the namesake of the Brâncovenesc style of architecture. It is considered by UNESCO as a masterpiece of this style. It is known for its rich ornamental details and votive paintings. In the 18th century, an influential school of mural and icon painting was established in the monastery.
Churches of Moldavia	Sucevita church with painted walls inside a walled complex	Suceava County	1993	598bis; i, iv (cultural)	This site comprises eight churches built in the 15th and 16th centuries. In line with the regional period style, the facades of the churches are entirely covered by frescos inspired by Byzantine art. The paintings depict Biblical themes and are well preserved. The churches include the Beheading of Saint John the Baptist Church, the Assumption of the Virgin and of Saint George's Church of the Humor Monastery, the Church of the Annunciation of Moldovița Monastery, the Sacred Cross Church, the Saint Nicolas' Church of Probota Monastery, the Saint John the New Monastery, the Saint George's Church of the former Voroneț Monastery, and the Church of the Resurrection of Sucevița Monastery (pictured). The latter church was added to the list in 2010.
Historic Centre of Sighișoara	A winter view of the old town, including several spires	Mureș County	1999	902; iii, v (cultural)	The historic centre of the city of Sighișoara dates from the 12th century. It is a well-preserved example of a small fortified medieval town shaped by the interactions of cultures from Central Europe and the Byzantine-Orthodox Southeastern Europe. It was founded by the Transylvanian Saxons, a community of German merchants and craftsmen. They have lived in the region for over 850 years, however, due to immigration in modern times, their culture will be preserved only through architectural monuments.
Wooden churches of Maramureș	A wooden church with a pointy spire	Maramureș County	1999	904; iv (cultural)	This site comprises eight churches from the 17th and 18th century in Maramureș County. The churches are made of wood and they combine influences of Orthodox and Gothic architecture styles. Some of the common characteristics of the churches include tall, slim clock towers and roofs covered by shingles. The list includes the Church of the Presentation of the Virgin in the Temple in Bârsana, the Church of Saint Nicholas (pictured) in Budești, the Saint Parascheva Church in Desești, the Church of the Nativity of the Virgin in Ieud Deal, the Church of the Holy Archangels in Plopiș, the Saint Parascheva Church in Poienile Izei, the Church of the Holy Archangels in Rogoz, and the Church of the Holy Archangels in Șurdești.
Dacian Fortresses of the Orăștie Mountains	Ruins of different buildings in a grassy setting	Hunedoara County and Alba County	1999	906; ii, iii, iv (cultural)	The six fortresses that comprise this site, Sarmizegetusa, Costeşti-Cetăţuie, Costeşti-Blidaru, Luncani-Piatra Roşie, Bănița, and Căpâlna, were built in the 1st century BCE and 1st century CE and served as protection against Roman conquest during the Roman-Dacian wars. They are representative examples of two characteristic types of forts of Late Iron Age Europe, the hilltop fort and its successor which evolved from it, the oppidum.
Ancient and Primeval Beech Forests of the Carpathians and Other Regions of Europe*	Waterfall in a beech forest	several sites	2017	1133quater; ix (natural)	This site comprises undisturbed examples of temperate forests that demonstrate the postglacial expansion process of European beech from a few isolated refuge areas in the Alps, Carpathians, Dinarides, Mediterranean, and Pyrenees. The site was originally listed in 2007 as the Primeval Beech Forests of the Carpathians, shared by Slovakia and Ukraine, extended in 2011 to include the Ancient Beech Forests of Germany, extended in 2017 to list 12 areas in Romania and in some other countries, and further expanded in 2021 to include forests in a total of 18 countries.
Roșia Montană Mining Cultural Landscape^{†}	Open-pit mine	Alba County	2021	1552rev; ii, iii, iv (cultural)	Roșia Montană is located in the western part of the Romanian Carpathians. The area is rich in deposits of precious metals and has been a centre of gold mining starting in Bronze Age and continuing in the 21st century. Before the discovery of America, the area was the main European source of gold. Important remains date from Roman times, when the mining town of Alburnus Maior was founded. In the medieval period, mining was mostly carried out by families of peasant-miners, this pre-industrial practice continued until the nationalisation in 1948. Upon the inscription, the site was immediately listed as endangered due to threats posed by plans to resume mining.
Sculptural Ensemble of Constantin Brâncuși at Târgu Jiu		Gorj County	2024	i, ii (cultural)	The group of monuments at Târgu Jiu was designed by the Romanian sculptor Constantin Brâncuși in 1937 to commemorate the soldiers who died in World War I. There are three sculptures in the assembly, The Table of Silence (Masa tăcerii), The Gate of the Kiss (Poarta sărutului), and the Endless Column (Coloana fără sfârșit), which is depicted in the picture. In the groups of monuments, the old Orthodox church of Târgu Jiu and the houses from the Calea Eroilor are included into UNESCO.
Frontiers of the Roman Empire — Dacia	Ruins of buildings, overgrown with grass	several sites	2024	1718; ii, iii, iv (cultural)	This site comprises the Dacian section of Roman Limes. Stretching over more than 1,000 km (620 mi), this was the longest land Roman border sector of Europe. Around 100 forts, 50 small fortifications, and more than 150 towers in Romania have been identified. Ruins of Micia are pictured.

== Tentative list ==
In addition to sites inscribed on the World Heritage list, member states can maintain a list of tentative sites that they may consider for nomination. Nominations for the World Heritage list are only accepted if the site was previously listed on the tentative list. As of 2026, Romania recorded 19 sites on its tentative list.

Tentative World Heritage Sites
Site	Image	Location	Year listed	UNESCO criteria	Description
Byzantine and Post-Byzantine Churches in Curtea de Argeș	Church building in white stone	Argeș County	1991	i, ii, iv (cultural)	Curtea de Argeș was the old capital of Wallachia. The princely court, dating from the 13th to 16th centuries, is now in ruins. The Church of St. Nicholas dates to the 14th century while the Curtea de Argeș Cathedral (pictured), a part of a former monastery, is from the 16th century.
Rupestral Ensemble from Basarabi	Rock carving of a lion	Constanța County	1991	(cultural)	The rock complex, located near the town of Murfatlar (formerly known as Basarabi) in an old chalk quarry, was converted into a monastic complex from the 10th to the 12th centuries. Several inscriptions are carved to the walls in different scripts, including Greek, Glagolitic, Cyrillic script, and Turkic runes. There are also several carvings depicting Biblical topics.
Cule from Oltenia	A white tower with a wooden roof	several sites	1991	iv, v (cultural)	Cule (singular: culă; from Turkish kule "tower, turret") are semi-fortified buildings found in the Oltenia (also known as Lesser Wallachia) region. They were built to watch important routes and were used by greater and lesser nobility. The Culă Greceanu is pictured.
Densuș Church	A church built in stone	Hunedoara County	1991	i, iv (cultural)	The church was built at the latest in the 14th century on the site of a Roman temple, the materials of which were used in the construction. The interior paintings date from the 15th century.
Historic Town of Alba Iulia	Star fort, look from above	Alba County	1991	iv, v, vi (cultural)	Alba Iulia lies on the site of a 2nd-century CE Roman camp Apulon. The medieval town was surrounded by bastions in the 18th century. Important buildings include the Catholic St. Michael's Cathedral from the 13th century, the Orthodox Coronation Cathedral from 1992, the Prince's Palace and the Batthyaneum Library. The Alba Carolina Citadel, a start fort, is pictured.
Retezat Massif	Mounains and a small lake	Hunedoara County	1991	(natural)	No description is provided in the nomination documentation.
Pietrosul Rodnei mountain peak	Mounains and some old houses in front	Bistrița-Năsăud County	1991	(natural)	No description is provided in the nomination documentation.
Sânpetru Formation	Drawing of a pterosaur	Hunedoara County	1991	(natural)	No description is provided in the nomination documentation. The Sânpetru Formation is a geological deposit from the Late Cretaceous period (Maastrichtian stage), rich in dinosaur and other fossils. Artist's impression of the pterosaur Eurazhdarcho, discovered at the site, is pictured.
Slătioara secular forest		Suceava County	1991	(natural)	This is a nomination of the Slătioara secular forest that has since been listed as a part of Ancient and Primeval Beech Forests of the Carpathians and Other Regions of Europe.
The Historic Centre of Sibiu and its Ensemble of Squares	Grand Square with some people walking	Sibiu County	2004	ii, iii, iv, v (cultural)	The first records of Sibiu, founded by Transylvanian Saxons, are from the year 1191. Since 1366, the town has been known as Hermannstadt and was the capital of the Saxon settlement in Transylvania. The Saxon University was founded in the town in the 15th century and in 1543, Sibiu was the centre of the Reformation in the region. Among the prominent architectural features of the town are the three interconnected squares of the Upper Town (Huet, Kleiner Ring, Grosser Ring), as well as a series of buildings in the Gothic, Renaissance, and Baroque styles.
The old villages of Hollókő and Rimetea and their surroundings*	Two old houses with white facades, flower pots in front	Alba County	2012	v (cultural)	This is a proposed extension to the Hollókő village, which has been listed as a World Heritage site in Hungary since 1987. Rimetea developed in the 17th and 18th centuries and has been deliberately preserved as a living example of rural life before the agricultural revolution of the 20th century. The village has a strong Hungarian community.
Frontiers of the Roman Empire — The Danube Limes (Romania)*	Stone gate with two towers and two arched passes	several sites	2020	ii, iii, iv (cultural)	This is a transnational nomination covering sites with Roman fortifications along the Danube river. The reconstructed gate at Porolissum is pictured.
Former Communist Prisons in Romania		several sites	2024	vi (cultural)	This nomination comprises five former Communist prisons: Jilava (pictured), Râmnicu Sărat, Pitești, Făgăraș, and Sighetu Marmației penitentiaries.
Movile Cave		Constanța County	2024	viii, ix, x (natural)	The cave is nominated as its aquifer forms a unique, isolated ecosystem shaped by the high concentration of sulfur compounds but little oxygen, with most organisms relying on chemosynthesis to survive.
Princely religious foundations in Wallachia and Moldavia		Argeș County and Iași County	2024	i, ii (cultural)	The nomination combines two churches: the Cathedral Church of The Assumption of Virgin Mary at Curtea de Argeș (a tentative site since 1991) and the Church of the Three Holy Hierarchs at Iași (a former tentative site, pictured).
Royal Residences of Sinaia		Prahova County	2024	ii, iv, vi (cultural)	The nomination comprises parts of Sinaia built during the reign of Carol I, most notably the Peleș Castle (pictured), the Pelișor Castle, and the Foișor Castle.
Cucuteni-Trypillia Civilization*	A decorated bowl	Bacău, Botoșani, Covasna, Harghita, Iași, Neamț, Suceava, and Vaslui counties	2026	i, ii, iii, iv, v (cultural)	This nomination shared with Moldova and Ukraine comprises numerous sites of the Cucuteni–Trypillia culture. This Chalcolithic civilization built interconnected planned settlements, over 5,000 of which have been discovered; those covering areas greater than 100 ha are classified as mega settlements and are unique to this culture. They practiced advanced agriculture, pottery (example pictured), metallurgy, and arts. From Romania, thirty-six sites are nominated.
Vânători Neamț Monastic Landscape	A stone church with tourists around	Neamț County	2026	iii, iv, vi (cultural)	The monastery was founded in the 14th century. The church was built in the late 15th century, during the reign of king Stephen III of Moldavia, and is the most representative example of the Moldavian style of religious architecture. The monastery has been one of the most important regional centres of culture, it had a printing press and a school.
Coliboaia Cave	Cave drawings	Bihor County	2026	i, ii, iii (cultural)	
Ancient and Primeval Beech Forests of the Carpathians and Other Regions of Europe*		Caraș-Severin County	2026	ix (natural)	

== See also ==
- List of Intangible Cultural Heritage elements in Romania
