= List of Intangible Cultural Heritage elements in Romania =

Location of Romania

The United Nations Educational, Scientific and Cultural Organization (UNESCO) defines intangible cultural heritage elements as non-physical traditions and practices performed by a people. As part of a country's cultural heritage, they include celebrations, festivals, performances, oral traditions, music, and the making of handicrafts. The term intangible cultural heritage is formally established by the Convention for the Safeguarding of the Intangible Cultural Heritage, which was drafted in 2003 and took effect in 2006. The inscription of new heritage elements on UNESCO's Intangible Cultural Heritage Lists for protection and safeguarding is determined by the Intergovernmental Committee for the Safeguarding of Intangible Cultural Heritage, an organization established by the Convention. Romania ratified the Convention on 20 January 2006.

National lists are required by the Convention for the further nomination of elements to the UNESCO lists.

== Intangible Cultural Heritage of Humanity ==
UNESCO's Intangible Cultural Heritage of Humanity consists of three lists: the Representative List of the Intangible Cultural Heritage of Humanity, the List of Intangible Cultural Heritage in Need of Urgent Safeguarding, and the Register of Good Safeguarding Practices. Romania only has elements inscribed on the Representative List. Romania has two practices currently nominated: "Traditional techniques of yogurt making and related social practices" and "Transhumance, the seasonal droving of livestock".

† Transnational element

=== Representative List ===
This list aims to represent the intangible cultural heritage of Romania worldwide and bring awareness to its significance.

Intangible Cultural Heritage elements recognized by UNESCO
Name	Media	Year	No.	Description
Căluş ritual	People dressed in white shirts, tan pants and dark boots dancing.	2008	00090	
Doina		2009	00192	
Craftsmanship of Horezu ceramics	Rows of colorful plates and jugs	2012	00610	
Men’s group Colindat, Christmas-time ritual † (Note: Shared with Moldova)		2013	00865	
Lad’s dances in Romania		2015	01092	
Traditional wall-carpet craftsmanship in Romania and the Republic of Moldova † (Note: Shared with Moldova)	Transylvanian rugs of the Lotto and Bird type in the Monastery Church, Sighișoara	2016	01167	
Cultural practices associated to the 1st of March † (Note: Shared with Bulgaria, North Macedonia, and Moldova)		2017	01287	
Lipizzan horse breeding traditions † (Note: Shared with Austria, Bosnia and Herzegovina, Croatia, Hungary, Italy, Slovakia, and Slovenia)	Side view of an almost entirely white horse	2022	01687	
The art of the traditional blouse with embroidery on the shoulder (altiţă) — an element of cultural identity in Romania and the Republic of Moldova † (Note: Shared with Moldova)		2022	01861	
Transhumance, the seasonal droving of livestock † (Note: Shared with Albania, Andorra, Austria, France, Greece, Italy, Luxembourg, Romania, and Spain.)		2023	01964	
Cobza, traditional knowledge, skills and music † (Note: Shared with Moldova.)		2025	02262	

== See also ==
- List of World Heritage Sites in Romania
- Culture of Romania
- Tourism in Romania
