= Historic Centre of Sighișoara =

Sighișoara Citadel
- Cetatea Sighișoara (Romanian)
- Historic Centre of Sighișoara
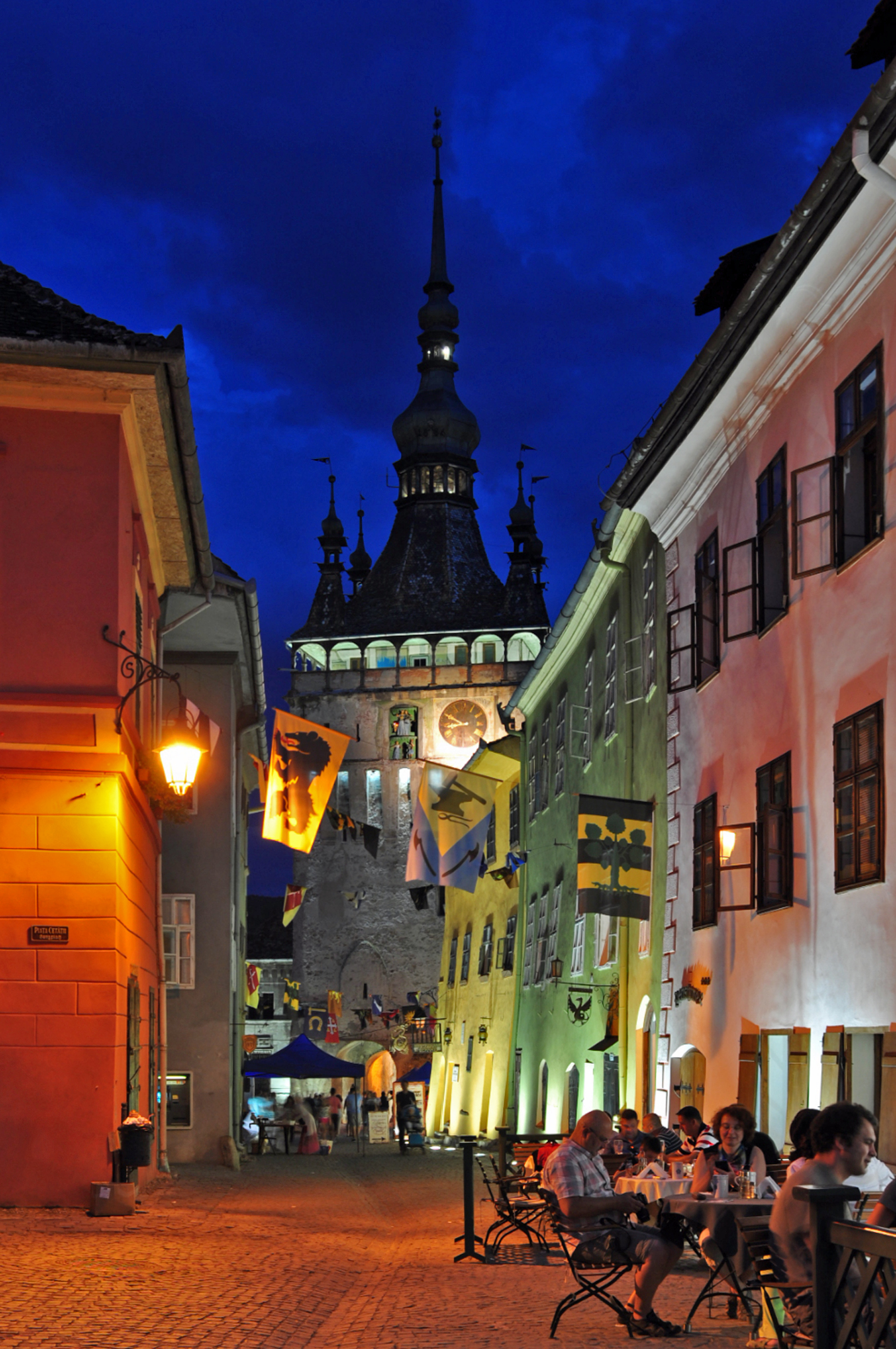

- Location of the Sighișoara Citadel in Mureș County Location of the Sighișoara Citadel in Romania
- 46°13′4″N 24°47′32″E
- Location: Sighișoara, Romania

History
- Built: 12th Century

Site notes
- Architectural style: Gothic

UNESCO World Heritage Site
- Official name: Historic Centre of Sighișoara
- Type: Cultural
- Criteria: iii, v
- Designated: 1999 (23rd session)
- Reference no.: 902
- Country: Romania
- Region: Europe and North America
- Link: https://whc.unesco.org/en/list/902

Listed Building – Grade I
- Official name: Sighisoara Citadel

The Historic Centre of Sighișoara (Sighișoara Citadel) is the old historic center of the town of Sighișoara (German: Schäßburg, Hungarian: Segesvár), Romania, built in the 12th century by Saxon settlers. It is an inhabited medieval citadel that, in 1999, was designated a UNESCO World Heritage Site for its 850-year-old testament to the history and culture of the Transylvanian Saxons.

Birthplace of Vlad III the Impaler (in Romanian Vlad Țepeș), Sighișoara hosts, every year, a medieval festival where arts and crafts blend with rock music and stage plays. The city marks the upper boundary of the Land of Sachsen. Like its bigger brothers, Sibiu (Hermannstadt) and Braşov (Kronstadt), Sighișoara exhibits Medieval German architectural and cultural heritage that was preserved even during the Communist period.

== Description ==
The fortress is surrounded by a 9.3 m (31 ft) high wall, originally about 4 m (13 ft) high. Later, the height of the wall was increased in some places to 14 m (46 ft). The wall was built between the 14th and 17th centuries as protection against Turkish attacks. The wall had 14 towers, 9 of which are preserved to this day. The towers served as the headquarters of various craft guilds.

- The Clock Tower (height: 64 m (210 ft); gate-tower)
- The Rope Makers' Tower (located on the plateau of Școala din Deal (School on the Hill), it was restored in the 19th century and now serves as the caretaker's dwelling of the Evangelical Cemetery on the hill)
- The Butchers' Tower (hexagonal)
- The Furriers' Tower (destroyed in the fire of 1676, but rebuilt; it has 4 levels)
- The Weavers' Tower (demolished in 1858, the stones were used to pave the fortress)
- The Tailors' Tower (on the opposite side of the Clock Tower, it is a gate-tower; it has 2 floors; its gunpowder storage exploded in the fire of 1676, destroying the tower, which was rebuilt)
- the Jeweler's / Goldsmiths' Tower (set on fire by lightning in 1809, it was demolished in 1863, when the German high school gym was built on its foundation; this was in turn converted into the cemetery chapel in 1935–1936)
- The Tinsmiths' Tower (height: 25 m (82 ft); four floors)
- The Tanners' Tower (one of the oldest)
- The Blacksmiths' Tower (built in 1631 on the foundations of the old Barber's Tower; destroyed in the fire of 1676, but rebuilt)
- The Tower of the Locksmiths and the Coopers were situated between the Tower of the Shoemakers and the Blacksmiths.
- The Fishermen's Tower once stood on the banks of the Târnava, much further outside the fortress, where the mill was located at that time. It is rarely mentioned. It can only be seen on the Museum model in the Clock Tower.
- The Shoemakers' Tower (marks the northern end of the fortress wall; mentioned in 1521, fortified in 1603, partially destroyed in 1606, rebuilt in 1650, burned in 1676, rebuilt in 1681).
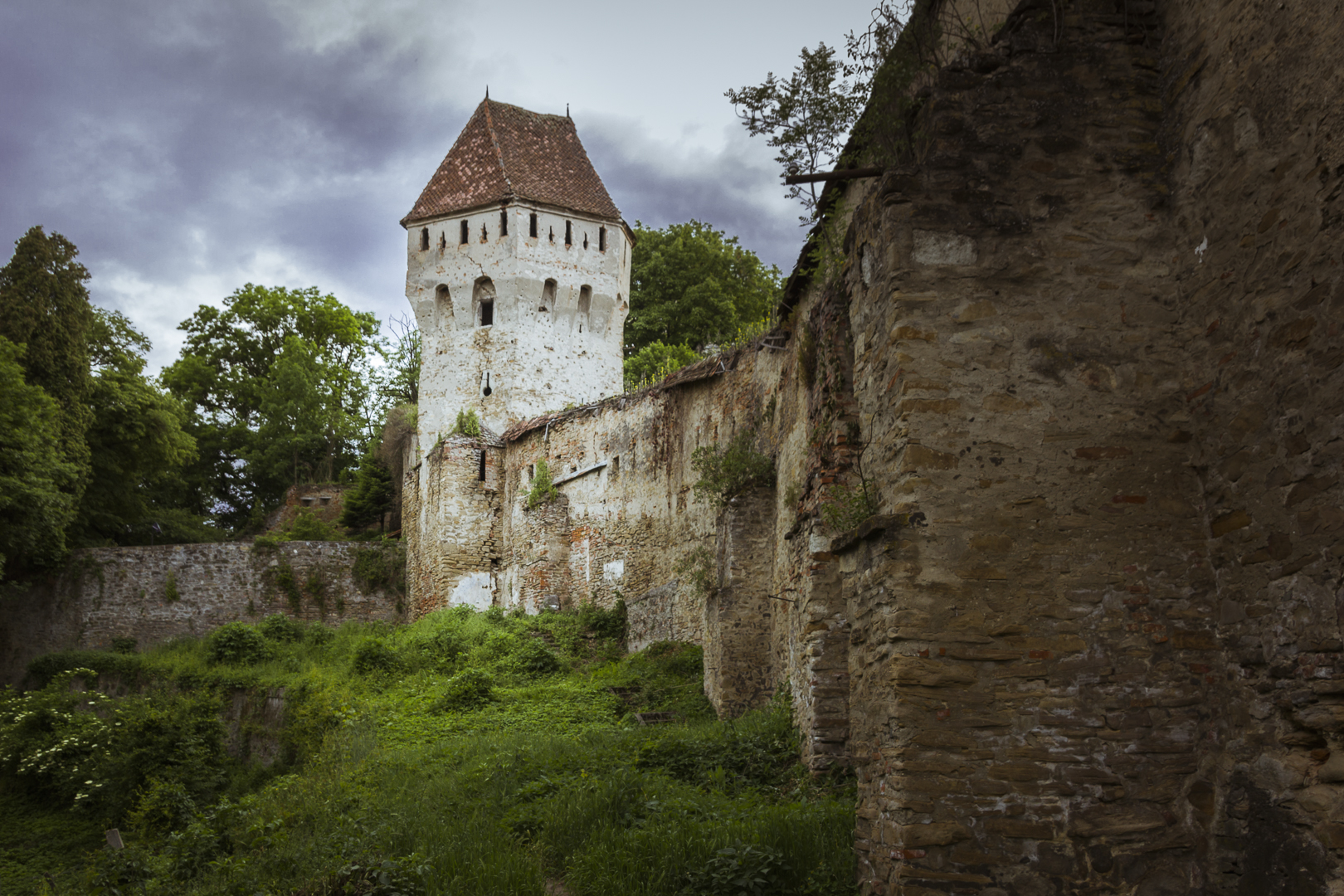
The Tinsmiths' Tower

== See also ==
- List of World Heritage Sites in Romania
