= Sighișoara Clock Tower =

Clock tower in Sighisoara, Romania

Coordinates: 46.2193°N 24.7933°E

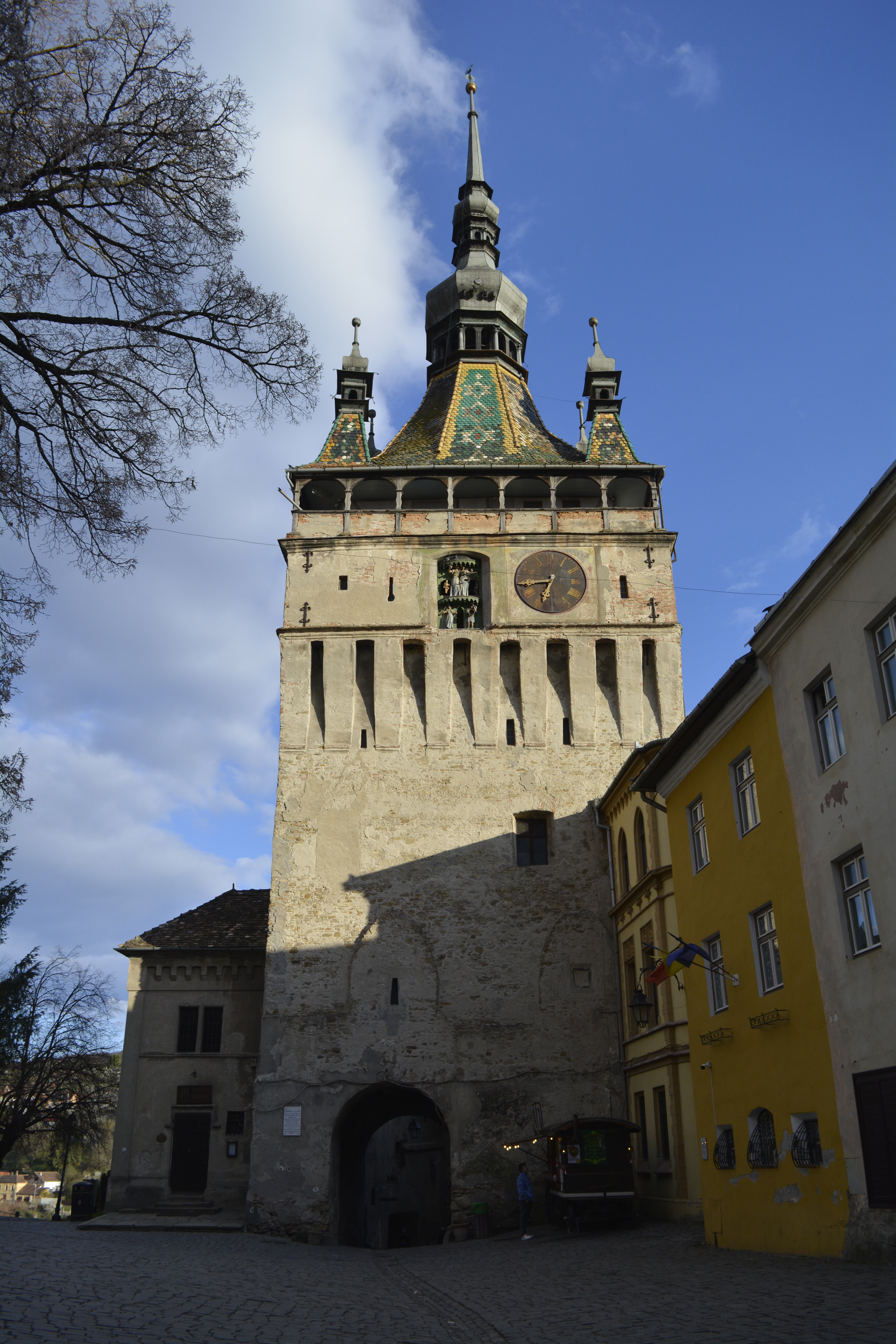
The Sighișoara Clock Tower in 2026

The Clock Tower (Romanian: Turnul cu Ceas, German: der Stundturm) of Sighișoara in Mureș County, Transylvania, Romania, is the main entry point to the walled upper city, opposite the Tailors' Tower. With its 64 meter height, the tower is visible from almost every corner of the city. Its purpose was to defend the main gate of the upper city. It also served as the town hall until 1656. It is considered to be one of the most important clock towers in Transylvania. It is included in the UNESCO World Heritage List No 902: Historic Centre of Sighişoara.

== History ==
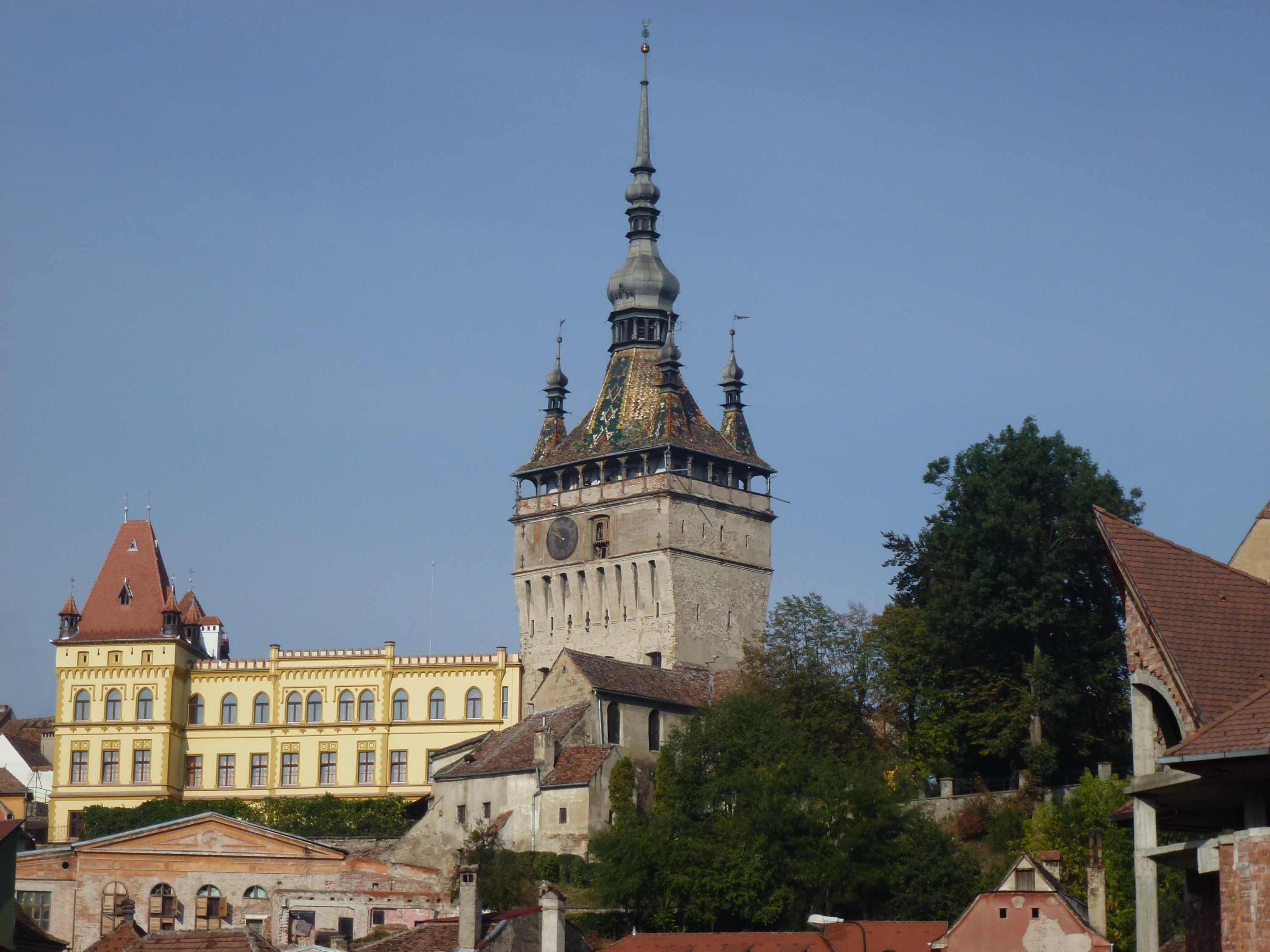
The Clock Tower in Sighișoara, as seen in the town centre during day time.

Construction of the tower began at the end of the 13th century and was completed in the 14th century as a simple gate tower with a maximum of two upper levels. The ground floor and first two floors of the tower were made of sandstone and river rock. The first stage of the tower construction probably had a form identical to the Tailors' Tower opposite. The thickness of the base walls was 2.35 meters, and 1.30 meters on the second floor. Stone tiles of basalt were used only at the corners. In the 16th century the old roof was demolished; two floors built of brick were added, as were a balcony and a new roof, although it is not known for sure how the roof was before the 1676 fire. The present Baroque roof with five turrets and onion bulbs represents an exceptional achievement of the three travelling master craftsmen: Veit Gruber from Tyrol, Philip Bong of Salzburg and the carpenter Valentinus "the foreigner" ("der Ausländer"), who rebuilt the tower after the great fire of 1676 from March to September 1677 for 650 florins. What makes this tower unique in Transylvania and Romania is its clock with carved figures.

It is a historical symbol of Sighișoara, and, unlike all the other towers that were owned and defended by different guilds, the Clock Tower was a public asset. It used to house the public administration offices, and, during holidays, the city orchestra. Since the end of the 19th century it has accommodated the History Museum of Sighișoara. Another important feature of this tower is the balcony, which is the most important observation point of the city: the unimpeded, wide view made it possible to promptly notice fires and direct towards them teams from the closest of the nine water sources in the city. It was a vital advantage, given that at the time the city did not dispose of much water. It was in fact necessary to dig for 35 metres to reach a water source.

=== Restorations ===
In 1964, the clock received an electric motor, without affecting its archaic look. Since 1898, the tower has served as a museum and major tourist attraction.

== Architectural features ==
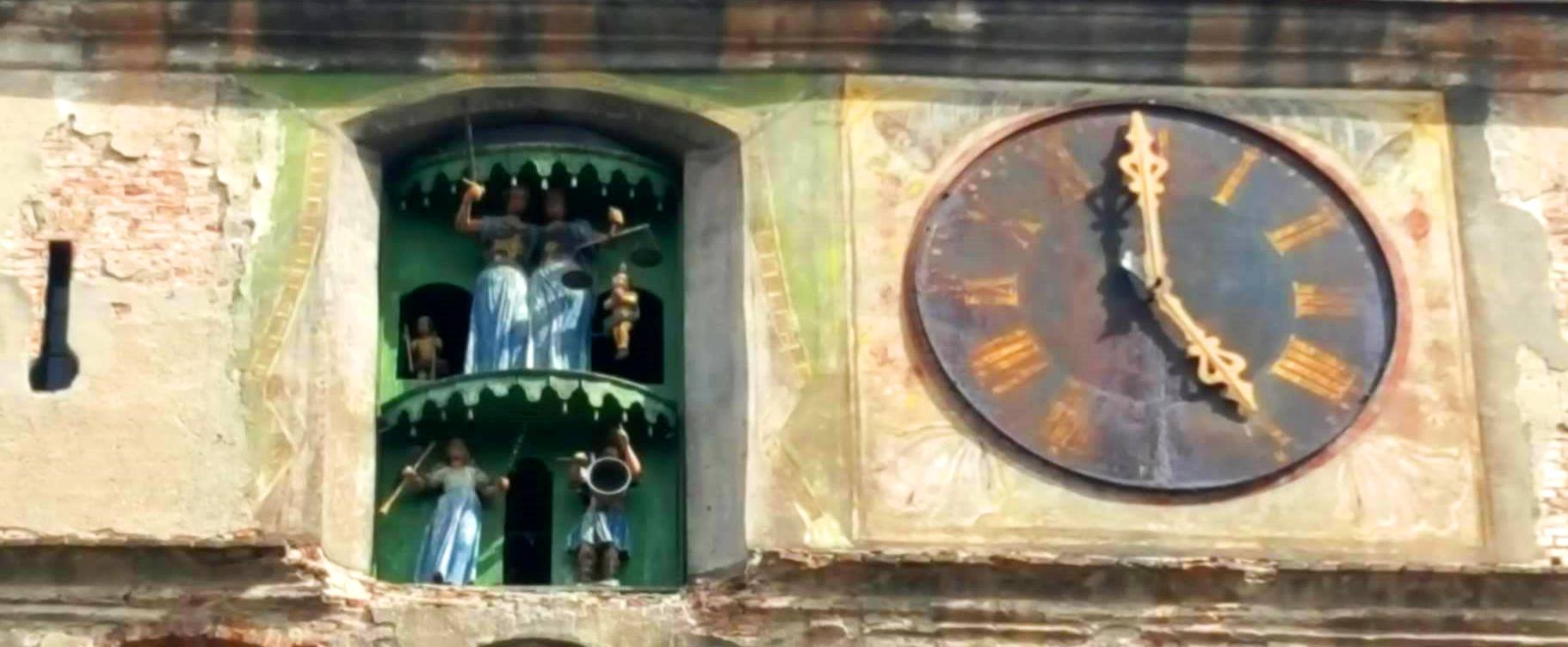
Details of the Clock Tower

The tower is a rectangular prism with massive walls, with a base measuring 12 by 8.66 meters, with four floors and an observation gallery. The current distance between the base of the tower and the base of the roof is 30 meters, and the height of the roof from the base to the top is 34 meters, so the roof is taller than the tower. The base of the tower is crossed by two vaulted, semi-cylindrical, parallel passages dating from the 13th century, provided in the past with solid oak doors and metal gratings, whose traces can still be partially seen today.

The tower carries many signs of local authority: the four turrets placed on the corners of the roof, each 12.5 meters high, are symbols of the city's judicial autonomy, signalling that the local judge could pronounce and execute sentences of capital punishment. The clock and some of the figures can also be considered symbols of public authority, as can the golden sphere at the top of the roof, 1 meter in diameter. The tower contains two clock mechanisms, one older wooden one and a newer one made of metal. The clock has two faces, one facing the upper city and the second the lower city, each holding a clock dial of 2.3 meters diameter, with black and gold hand-painted clock numbers. Two niches with symbolic figures on the inside are located on the left of the dials. In the niche facing the upper city are arranged, on three levels, the following figures:

- Pax, the goddess of peace (bottom left), holding an olive branch and a trumpet;
- The little drummer (on the right side), who hits a little bronze drum with the hammer in his right hand;
- Justice and Righteousness (in the centre): these two figures in blue dresses dominate the composition and are larger than the others. Justice is blindfolded and raises a sword in one hand, while Righteousness holds a pair of scales.
- Day and Night (in the upper level), fixed on a metal balance, are represented as two angels: Day has a head and a heart of flame burning in her hands, and Night carries a torch in each hand. They marked the 12-hour working day of the city craftsmen, at 6 a.m. and 6 p.m.

The niche located in the face looking towards the lower city has only two sections or levels:

- in the bottom left is placed a second little drummer (identical to its counterpart on the other front), and on the right is located a figure which has lost some attributes, representing, perhaps, "the Executioner”, holding in her hands, very likely, a whip and an axe, as a warning to outlaws.
- The central position is dominated by a rotating platform in which are mounted seven wooden figures representing the days of the week, but only one of them can be seen from the lower city through the small window on the right with ornamental wooden frets. Every night at 12 o'clock, the round platform rotates from left to right through a few degrees and installs the new day's figure to be seen in the morning by the citizens.

=== The seven day figures ===
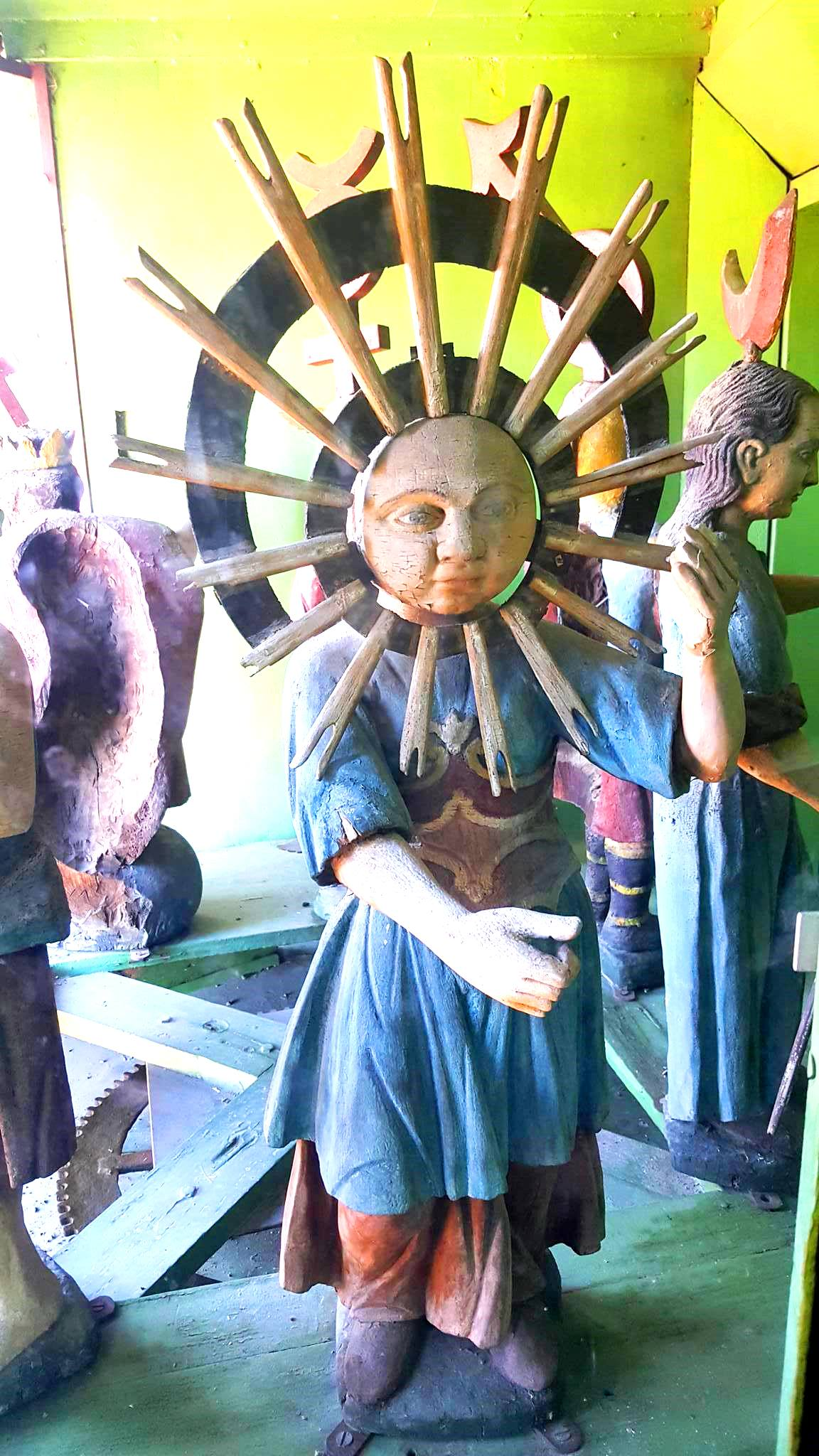
Sunday

At first sight the seven figures appear to represent only seven days of the week, but in reality they also depict the seven ancient gods, seven planets and seven basic metals.

- Sunday is represented as a female figure with a blue shirt, red skirt and wide belt, with a gold circle with rays around the head, representing the symbol for gold. For Romans and Greeks the Sun was a God (Sol or Helios), but this god in feminine clothes shows that the author took into account that the sun in the German language is female (Die Sonne). It is believed that the position of the arms of the figure symbolize the Sun God's movement that raises or lowers the riches of the earth.

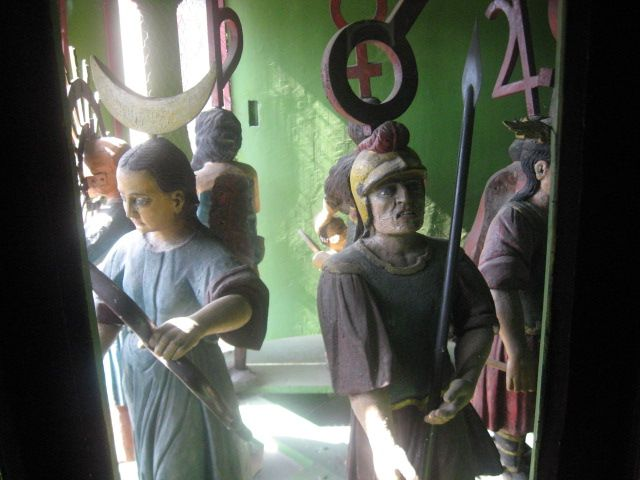
Monday/Tuesday

- Monday is a female figure dressed in a blue dress, with bow and arrow in her hands and a crescent moon on her head, the symbol of silver. Protector or Mistress of the night, the moon is the lunar Artemis of the Greeks or Diana of the Romans, the goddess of the hunt, protector of female nature, constantly changing.
- Tuesday is a male in a red shirt and blue waistcoat, wearing a helmet. He represents the alchemical symbol of iron and the God Ares or Mars. He carries a spear to reproduce the image of a soldier.
- Wednesday is a male figure with red coat and green waistcoat, wearing the attributes of the Greek God Hermes or the Roman God Mercury. He carries a caduceus in his right hand and a money bag in his left hand. He has two wings on his helmet and boots, indicating that he is the "messenger of the gods” who travels fast through levitation. The sign on his head is hermaphrodite in nature and symbolises mercury or quicksilver, a metal that can master the other elements. It is generally believed that Hermes was the god of trade and thieves, but in reality he was a messenger of mysteries and esoteric knowledge, a mediator between the visible world and the invisible one. Mercury and Hermes have no equivalent in German mythology: the German name of the day, Mittwoch, means simply midweek.
- Thursday is a figure that represents Jupiter or Zeus, with golden crown on his head, like a medieval king, with red shirt and ermine cloak. The right foot is placed on a globe, symbolising rule over the universe. In his right hand he holds the symbol of lightning, and in his left hand the symbol of thunder. Jupiter is the "Sunny Sky God" in Indo-European culture, who controls thunder. Germans called him "Donnar" and therefore the name of this day of the week is "Donnerstag". On the head of Zeus there is the alchemical symbol of tin, metal protector, non-corrosive and creator of new alloys.

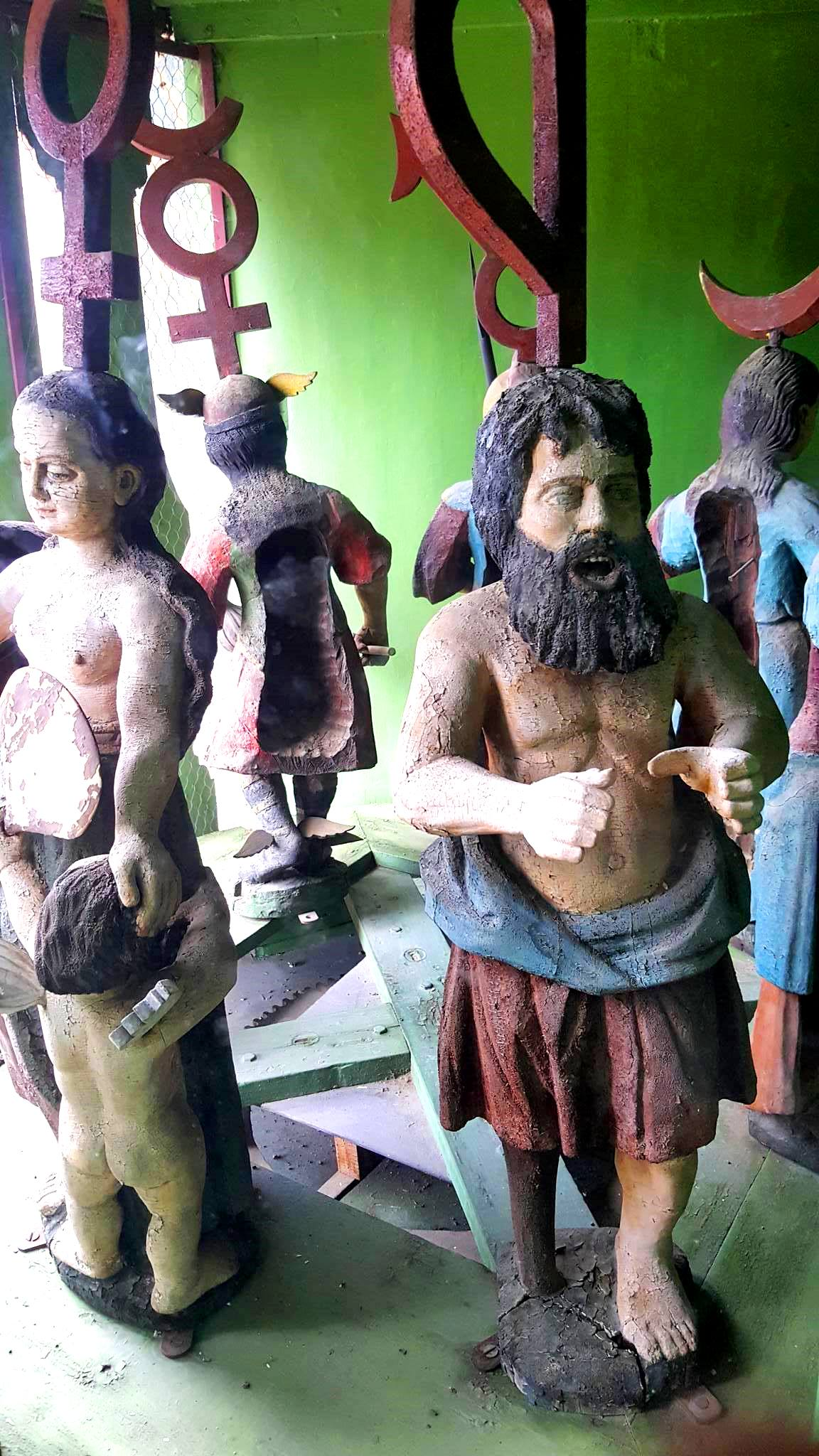
Saturday

- Friday is a female character representing Aphrodite or Venus, goddess of beauty and love as a winged figure holding her mirror so that she can admire her beauty. She wears a green skirt lined with red, and her chest and leg are unveiled. She carries on her head the symbol of copper, the red metal symbolising passion, which is always associated with green earth that symbolises beauty. For Germans, Friday is the day of the goddess "Freyja" (Freitag), who is also the goddess of love.
- Saturday is a figure that represents Saturn, father of the old gods. For Romans, Saturn was actually Cronos, the Greek Titan refugee in Italy who taught the Romans agriculture and in whose honour Saturnalia was celebrated, when people were fed at state expense. In the past, the figure of Saturn held in his hands a child who he was preparing to swallow, because, according to prophecy, one of his sons would follow to unseat him. His mother, Rhea, managed to rescue Zeus, the youngest son, but when he reached adulthood he ordered Cronos to bring to light his swallowed brothers. The figure is naked to the waist, with a blue shirt and red shorts which hangs around the waistband. On his head he has the mark of lead, symbol of stagnation and cessation of motion. It is unknown why exactly he has a wooden leg (prosthesis). Perhaps it is a misunderstanding, arising from the fact that in the original figure the legs were wrapped in strips of cloth that were opened only for the holidays. All European languages use for Saturday the Old Testament term Sabbath. Only the English kept the old name linked to Saturn: Saturday.

== Gallery ==
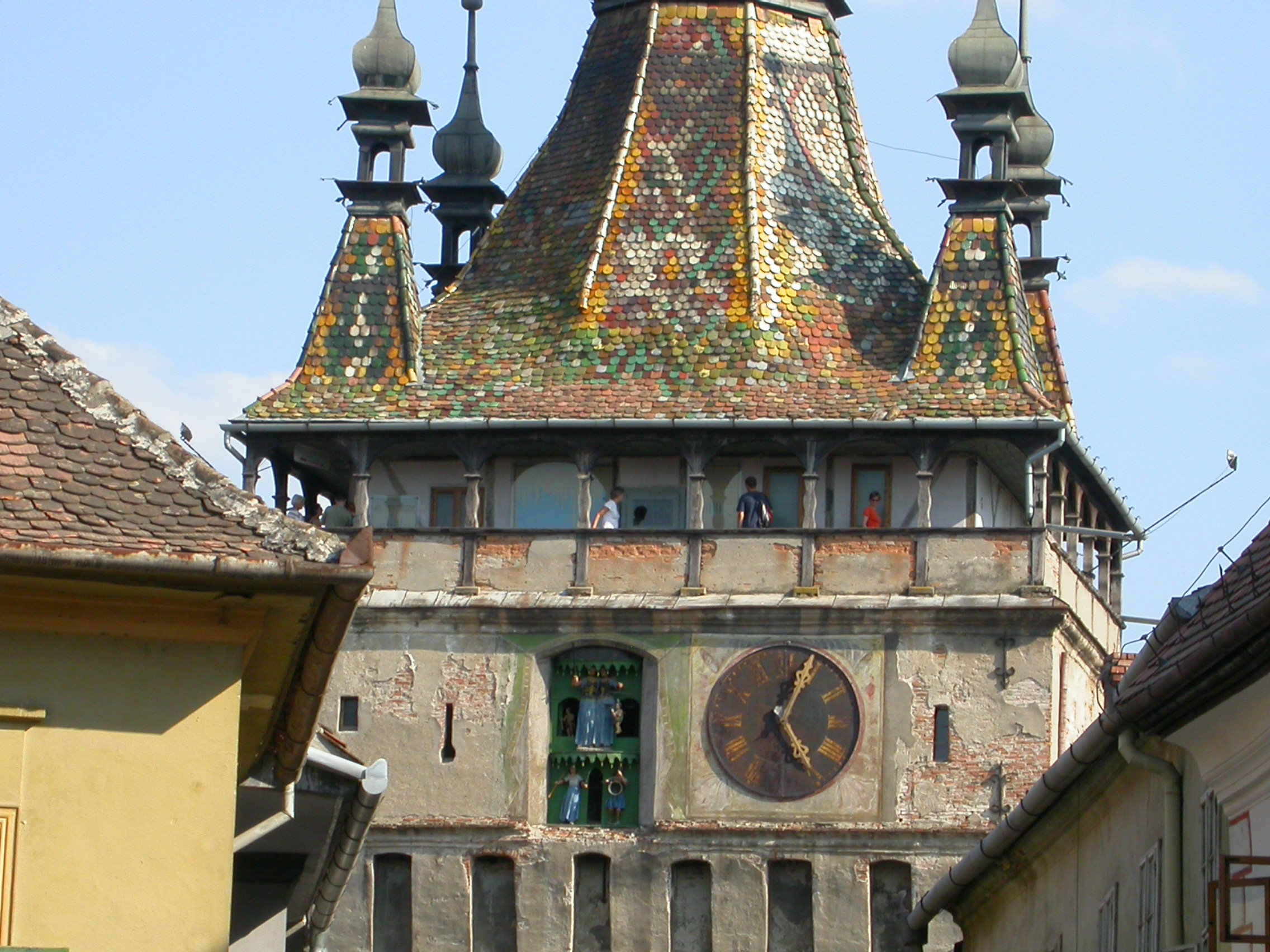
Close-up view of the Clock Tower in Sighișoara

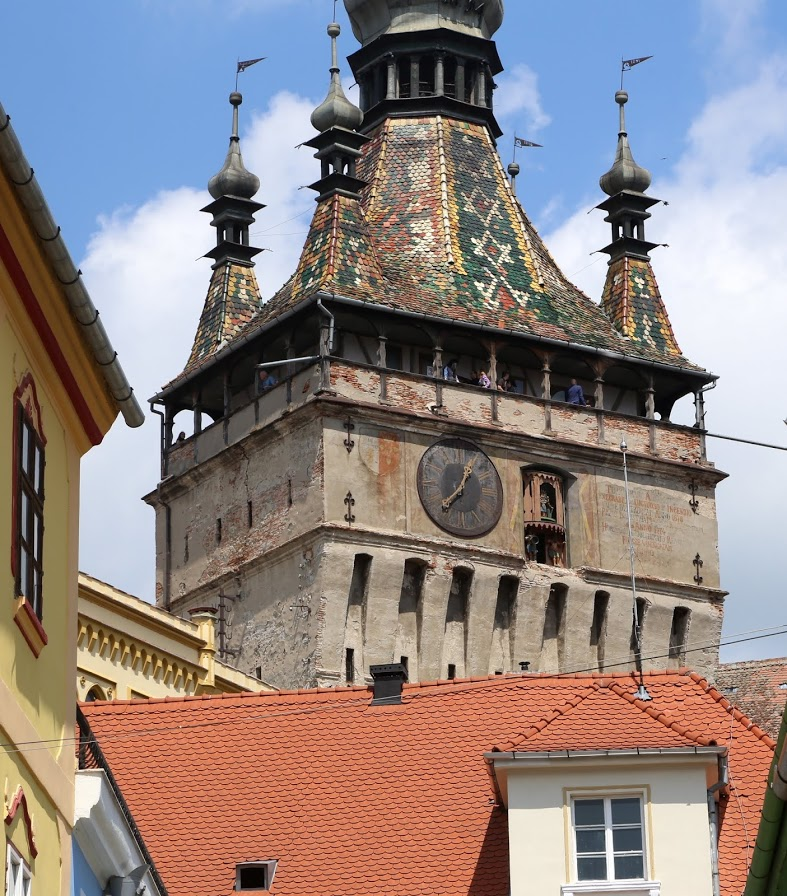
Close-up view of the Clock Tower in Sighișoara

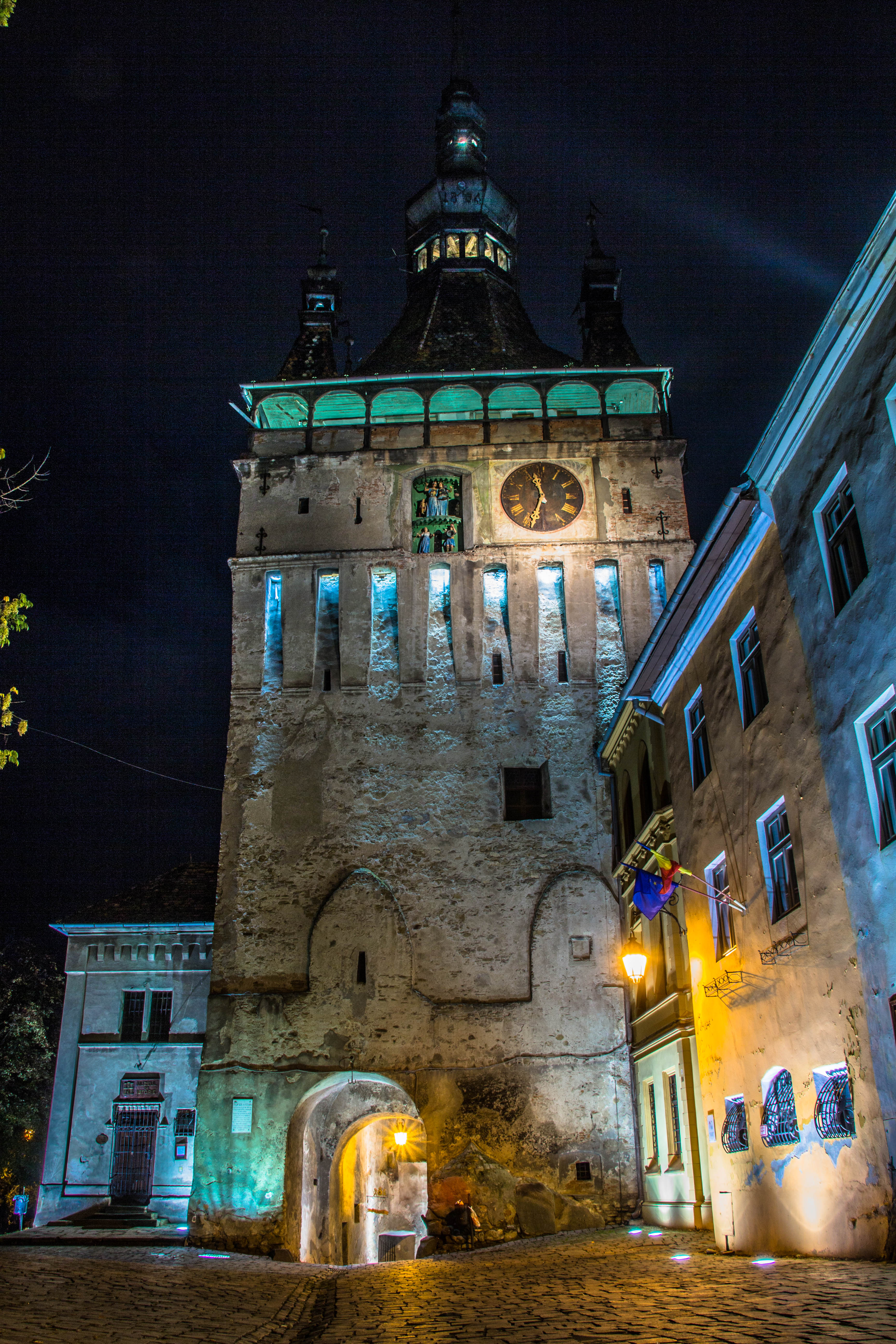
undefined

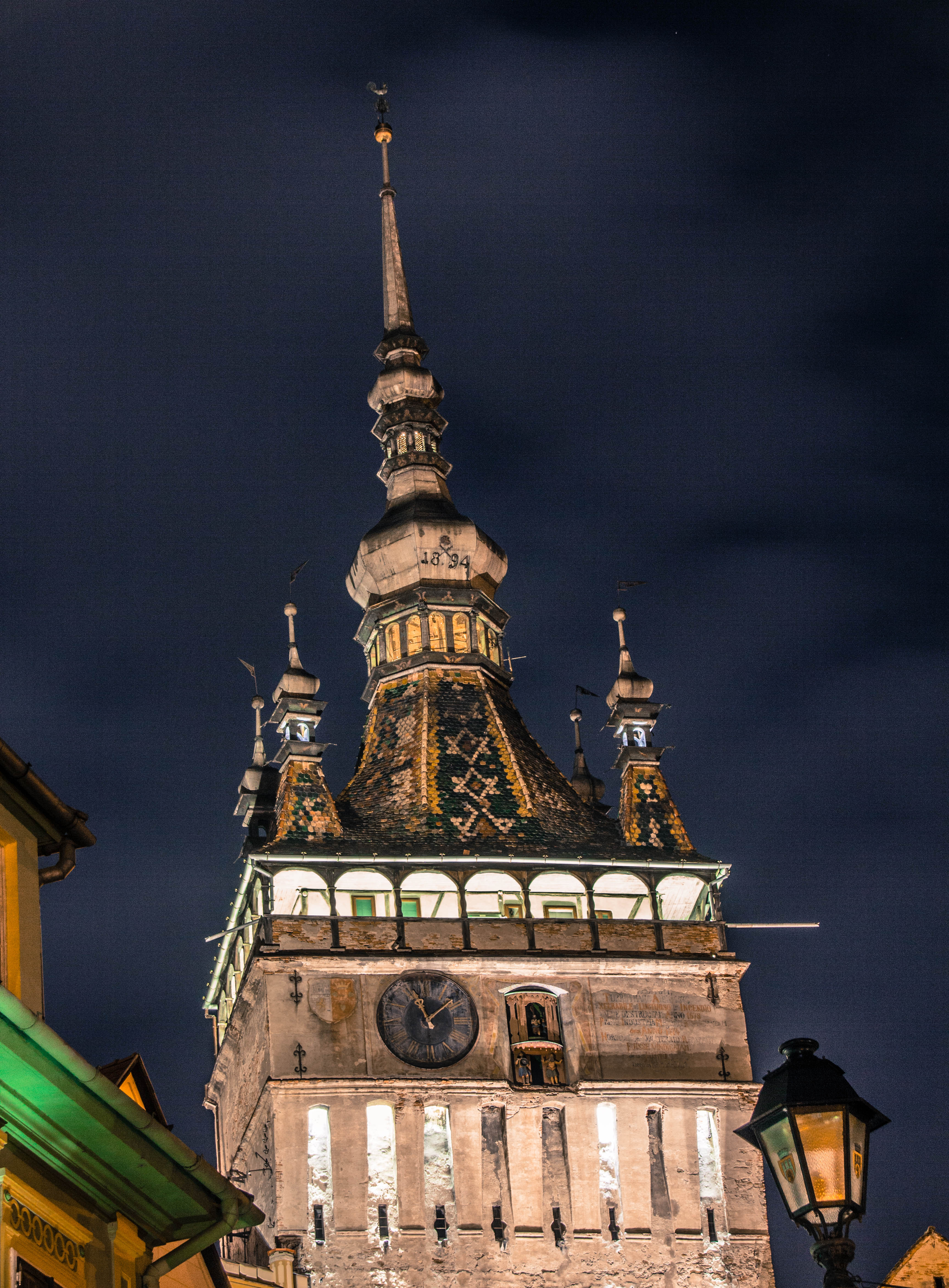
undefined

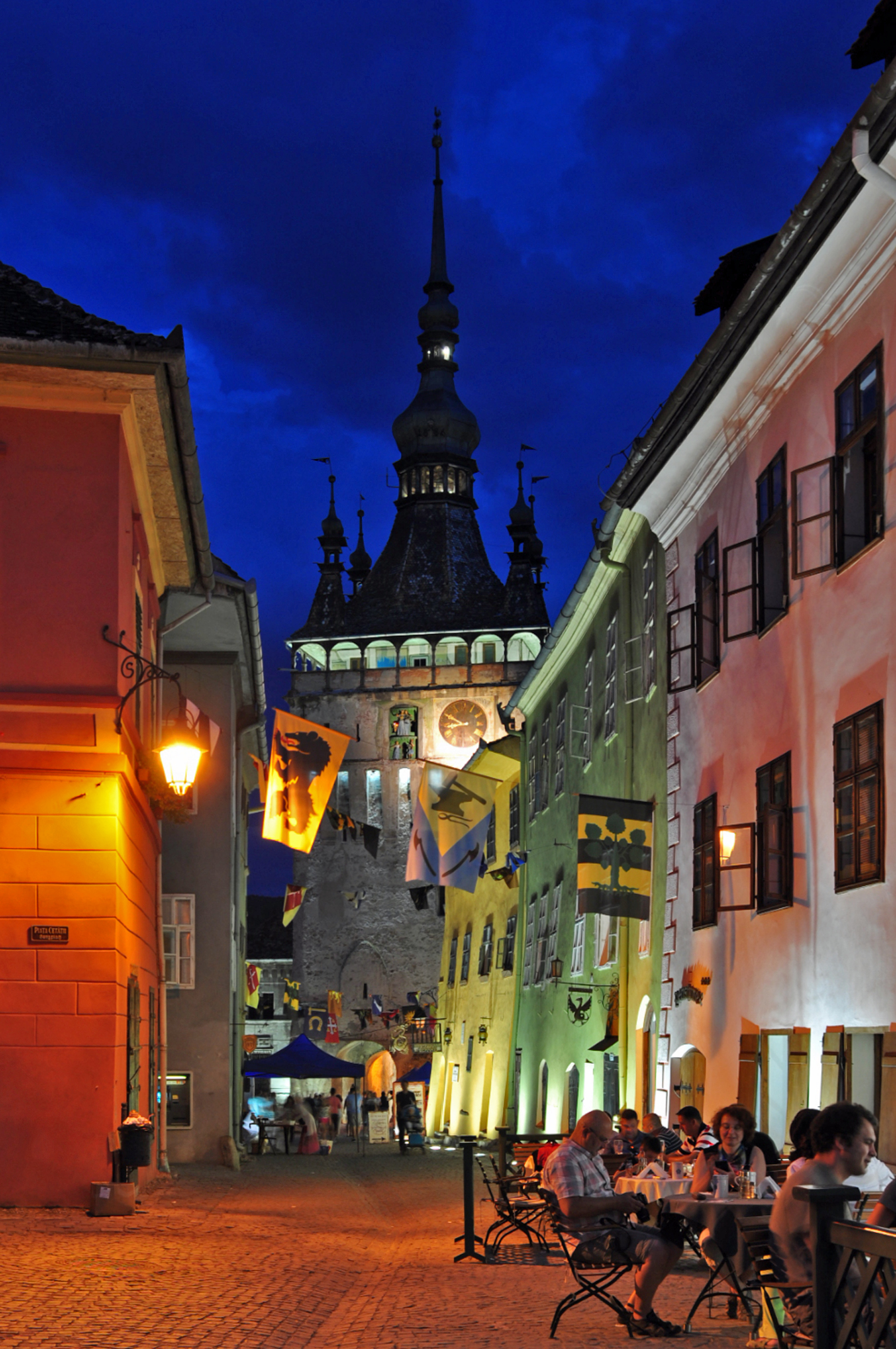
The Clock Tower at night

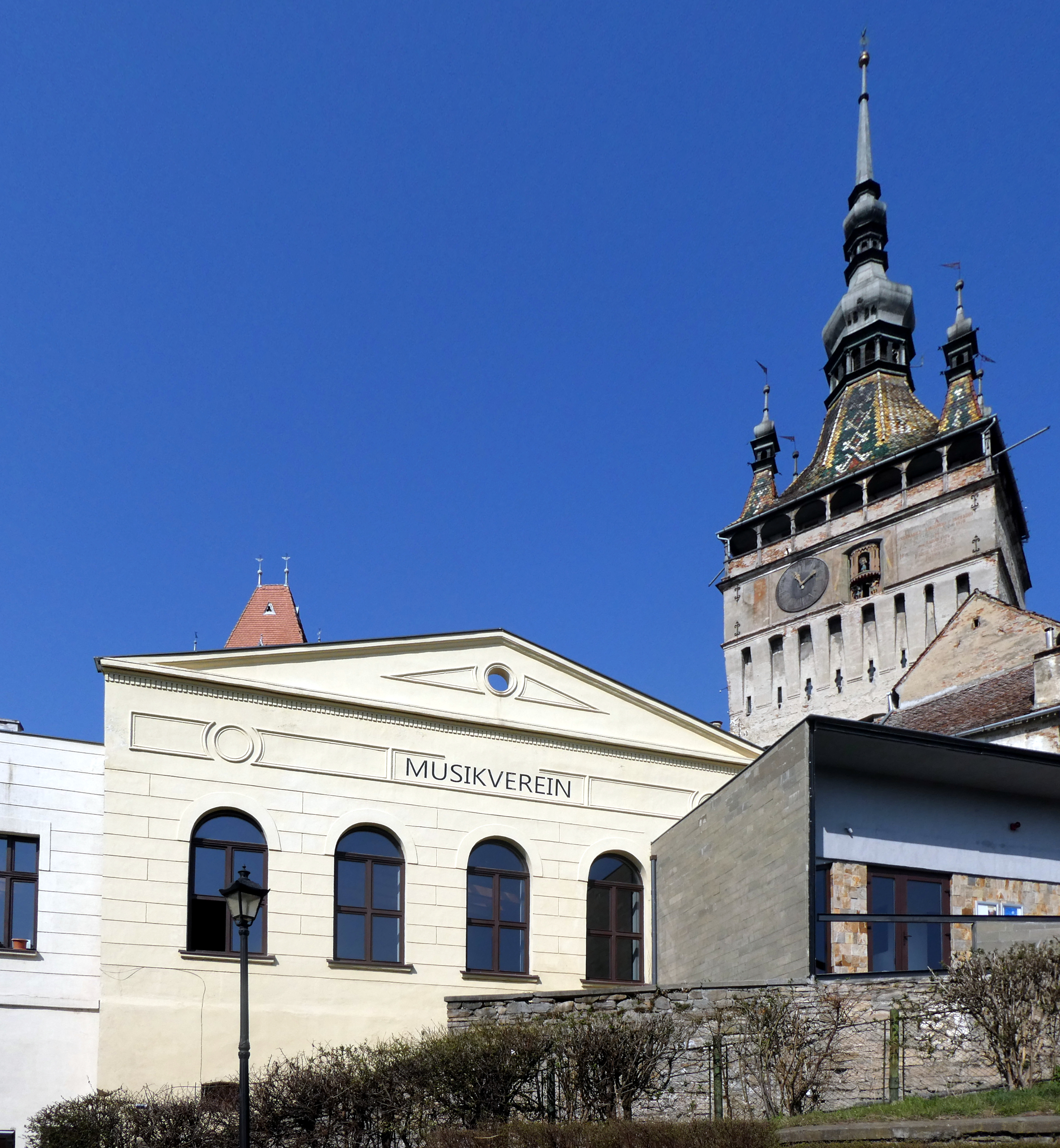
The Clock Tower during day time

== Sources ==
- Vasile Drăguț: Cetatea Sighișoara. Editura Meridiane, Bukarest 1969.
- Emil Giurgiu: Sighișoara. (Schäßburg). Editura Sport-Turism, Bukarest 1985, p. 148.
- Aurel Lupu, Kovacs György (et al.): Mureş. Monografie (= Judeţele Patriei). Editura Sport-Turism, Bukarest 1980, pp. 271–272.
- Helmut Schröcke: Siebenbürgen. Menschen – Kirchenburgen – Städte. Kulturleistungen einer deutschen Volksgruppe im Südosten. Mahnert-Lueg, München 1987, ISBN 3922170633, pp. 135–141
- Nicolae Teşculă: Clock Tower of Sighişoara. Monument and Museum (Turnul cu Ceas din Sighişora. Monument şi muzeu)), Editura Academiei Române, Historia Urbana, 2014, No 22, pp. 309–317 (online version)
- UNESCO: Historic Centre of Sighisoara
  Description
  Documents
  Advisory Body Evaluation (ICOMOS), 1999
