= Lepers' Church =

Church in Mureș County, Romania

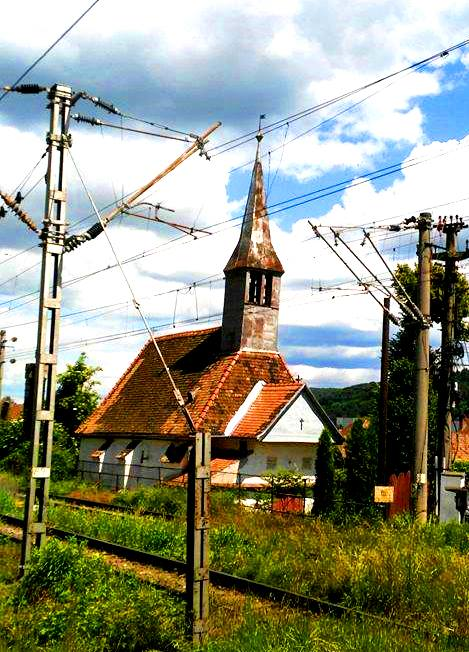
Lepers Church

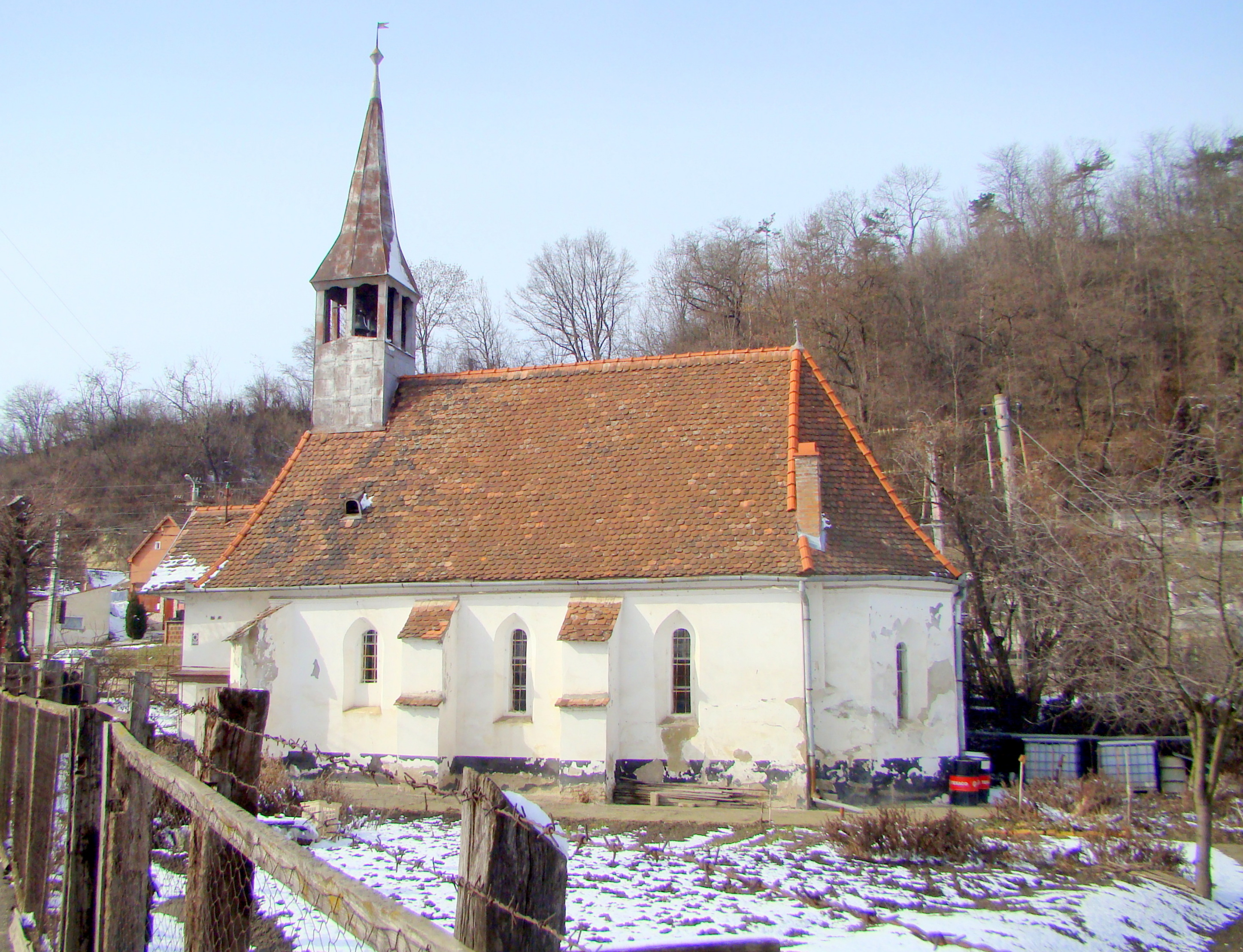

Lepers' Church (Biserica Leproşilor in Romanian) is a church located on the Târnava River bank of Sighișoara, Mureș County in Romania where is it part of the Sighisoara Citadel. It is located in the extreme northwest of the old neighbourhood of Siechhof. In 1507, a shelter for people with leprosy began operating next to the church. Since lepers were not allowed to enter the church, a pulpit was built on the west side, just near the entrance, from which the priest preached to the patients in the churchyard.

The last substantial changes were made in the late 19th century when railways were built a few meters from the church. On this occasion, the wall was demolished completely, the territory around the church was elevated, and the windows on the north face were obstructed.

Above the altar of this church there is a painting, Jesus and the Children, painted by L. Schuller in 1882 in a naturalistic style.
