= Botiza =

- Commune
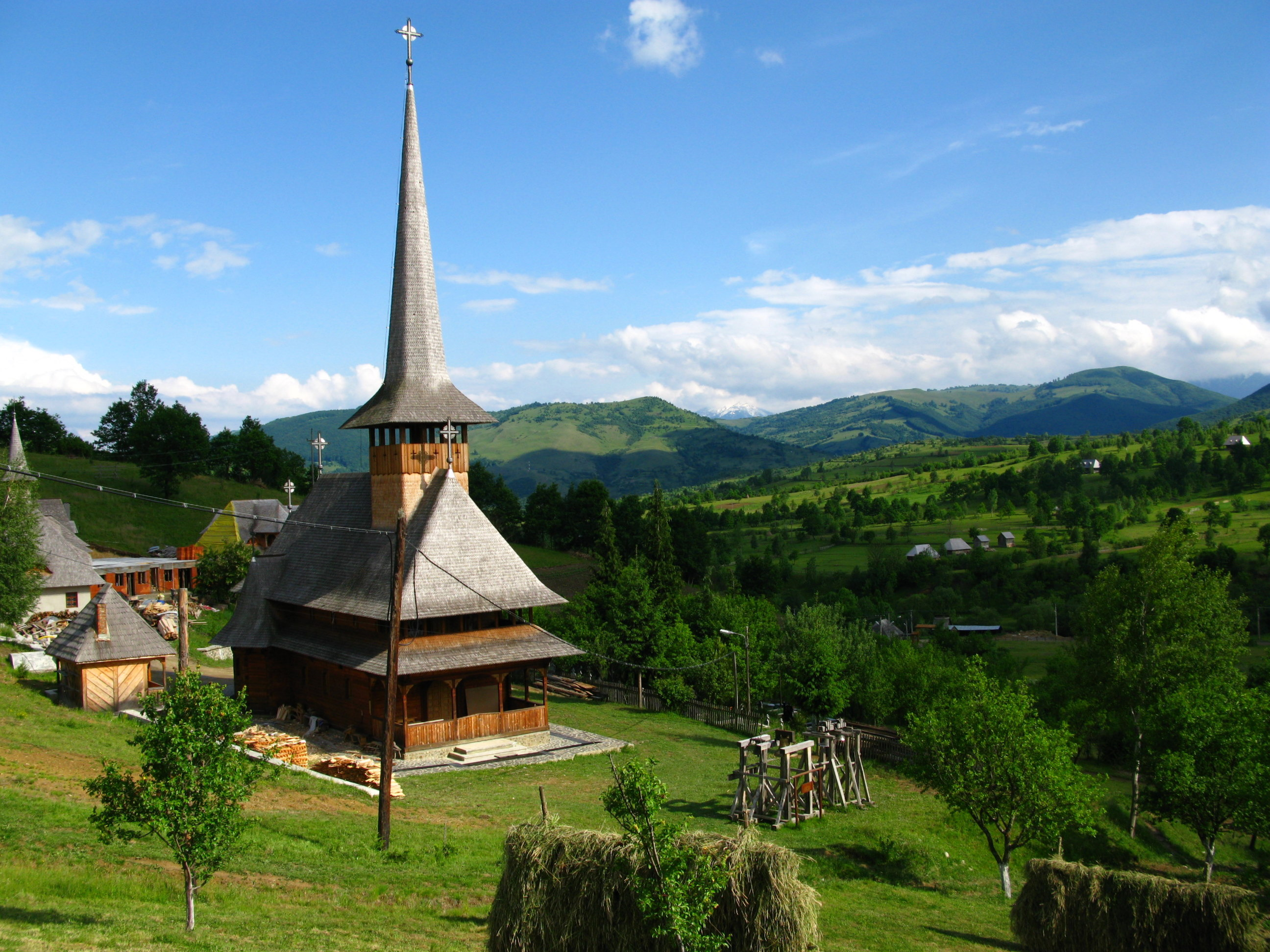
- Botiza Monastery (1998)

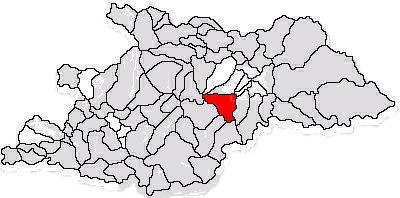
- Location in Maramureș County

- Location in Romania
- Coordinates: 47°40′N 24°09′E
- Country: Romania
- County: Maramureș

Government
  - Mayor (2020–2024): Florea Poienar (CMM)
- Area: 74.8 km^{2} (28.9 sq mi)
- Elevation: 483 m (1,585 ft)
- Population (2021-12-01): 2,373
  - Density: 31.7/km^{2} (82.2/sq mi)
- Time zone: UTC+02:00 (EET)
  - Summer (DST): UTC+03:00 (EEST)
- Postal code: 437065
- Area code: +(40) x59
- Vehicle reg.: MM
- Website: primariabotiza.ro

Botiza (Hungarian: Batiza, Yiddish: בוטיזה) is a commune in Maramureș County, Maramureș, Romania. The commune is well known for its handmade wool carpets. It is composed of a single village, Botiza. It also included Poienile Izei until that was split off to form a separate commune in 1995.

The commune is located in the central part of the county, in the southwestern foothills of the Maramureș Mountains, at an altitude of 483 m (1,585 ft). It is crossed by county roads DJ171A and DJ171D; the city of Sighetu Marmației is 40 km (25 mi) to the northwest, while the county seat, Baia Mare, is 66 km (41 mi) to the west.

Historical population
Year	Pop.	±%
1880	1,084	—
1900	1,807	+66.7%
1910	1,953	+8.1%
1930	2,042	+4.6%
1956	2,616	+28.1%
1977	2,963	+13.3%
1992	2,957	−0.2%
2002	2,964	+0.2%
2011	2,717	−8.3%
2021	2,373	−12.7%
Source: Census data

At the 2021 census, Botiza had a population of 2,373; of those, 96.25% were ethnic Romanians.
