= Ștefan Hrușcă =

Romanian folk singer

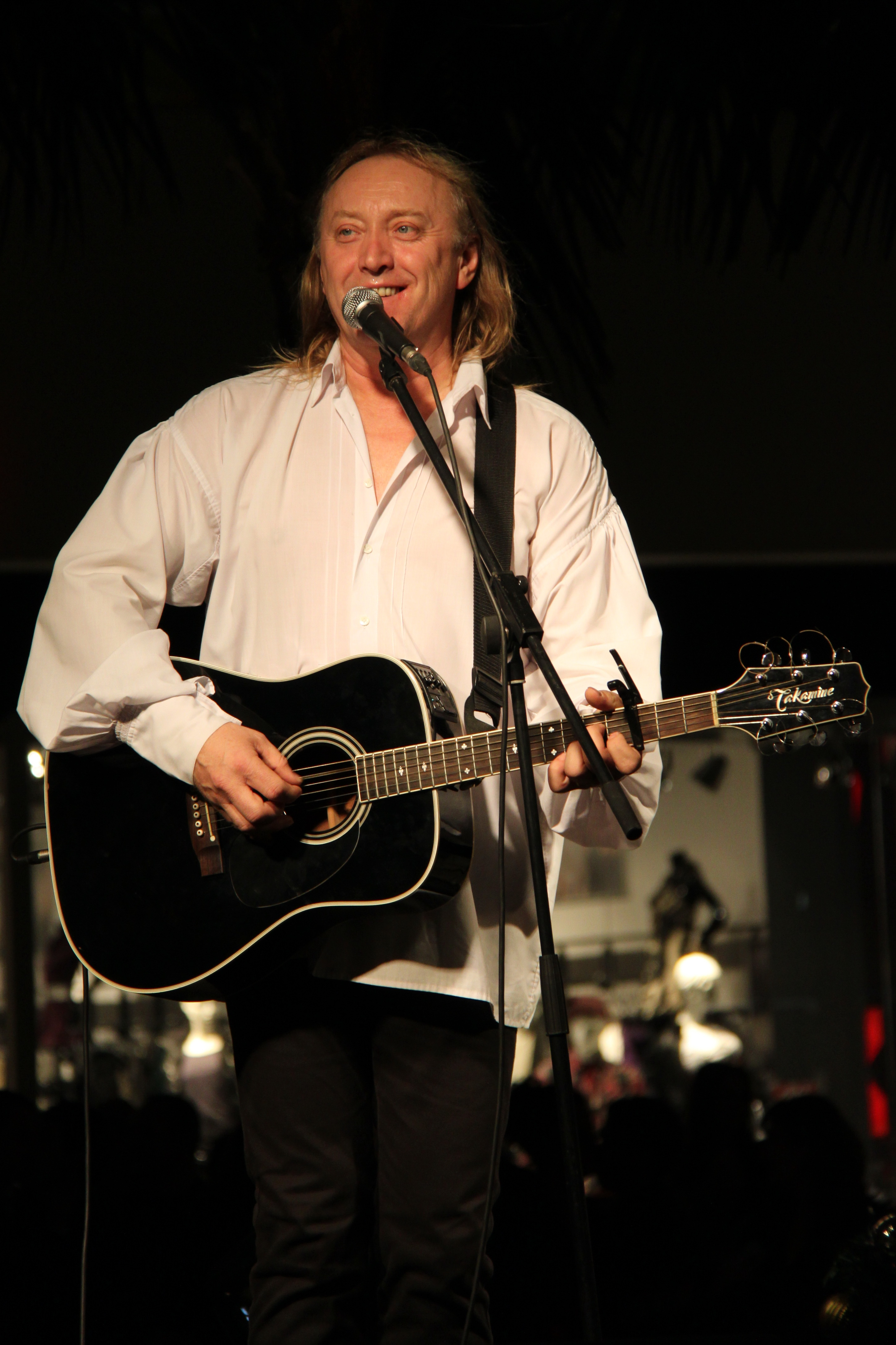

Background information
- Born: Ștefan Hrușcă; 8 December 1957 (age 68); Ieud, Maramureș County, Romania
- Genres: Folk music; colinde
- Instruments: Guitar; vocals
- Years active: 1981–present
- Formerly of: Cenaclul Flacăra

Ștefan Hrușcă (born 8 December 1957) is a Romanian-Canadian folk singer known for his Christmas carols. He was born in Ieud, Maramureș County.
