= Ieud (river) =

- Location within Romania

Location
- Country: Romania
- Counties: Maramureș County
- Villages: Ieud

Physical characteristics
- Mouth: Iza
  - location: Ieud
  - coordinates: 47.6972°N 24.2512°E
- Length: 16 km (9.9 mi)
- Basin size: 54 km^{2} (21 sq mi)

Basin features
- Progression: Iza→ Tisza→ Danube→ Black Sea
- Tributaries
  - left: Pârâul Poienilor

The Ieud is a left tributary of the river Iza in Romania. It discharges into the Iza in the village Ieud, near Bogdan Vodă. Its length is 16 km (9.9 mi) and its basin size is 54 km^{2} (21 sq mi).
