= Bessarabian rugs and carpets =

Eastern European carpet weaving tradition

Bessarabian rugs and carpets are the commonly given name for rugs in pile and tapestry technique originating in Russian provinces as well as Ukraine and Moldova during the late 19th and early 20th centuries. Some scholars will classify flat-woven carpets as Bessarabian, while referring to knotted-pile carpets as Ukrainian. They are predominantly from an area corresponding to modern Bulgaria and Romania. Produced under Late Ottoman rule, they stand right on the cusp of European and Oriental carpet weaving (see Turkish carpet).

While most Persian carpets can be classified to a specific region corresponding to their weave, this is not the case with Bessarabian carpets and rugs. With these rugs, the weave only gives clues about the market it was created for (rural or urban); therefore, a normal classification is disregarded and the broader term, "Bessarabian", is applied.

All works of the Bessarabian category are highly decorative. Not dissimilar to particular Karabaghs from the Caucasus, many of the designs crafted in Bessarabian carpets are floral in motif. The designs usually fit within a black or brown tone background, executed in a naturalistic western style. Some pieces, in particular the flat-weaves, are woven with the distinctive Bessarabian palette in the tradition of kilim rugs from nearby Anatolia.
