= Ieud Hill Church =

Heritage site in Maramureș County, Romania

- Biserica de lemn din Ieud Deal
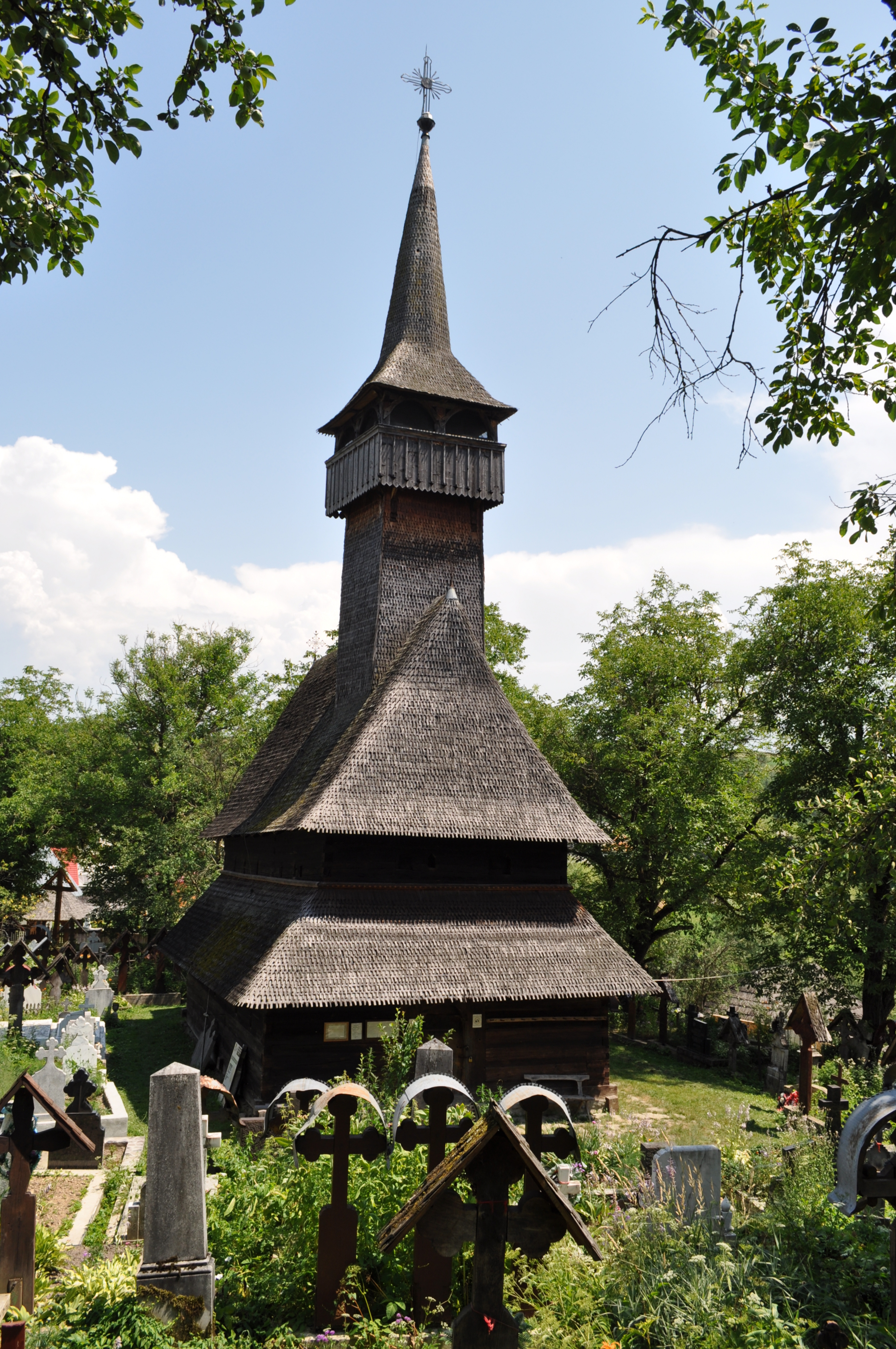
- Ieud Hill Church
- Address: Ieud, Maramureș
- Country: Romania
- Denomination: Eastern Orthodox

History
- Status: active church

Administration
- Diocese: Diocese of Maramureș and Sătmar

UNESCO World Heritage Site
- Part of: Wooden Churches of Maramureş
- Criteria: Cultural: (iv)
- Reference: 904
- Inscription: 1999 (23rd Session)

The Ieud Hill Church (Romanian: Biserica din Ieud Deal), dedicated to the Nativity of the Virgin, is a Romanian Orthodox church in Ieud Commune, Maramureș County, Romania. Built in the early 17th century, it is one of eight buildings that make up the wooden churches of Maramureș UNESCO World Heritage Site, and is also listed as a historic monument by the country's Ministry of Culture and Religious Affairs. Its name comes from the fact that it is located on a hill, and is used to distinguish it from the Ieud Valley Church.
