= Șișești, Maramureș =

Șișești
- Commune
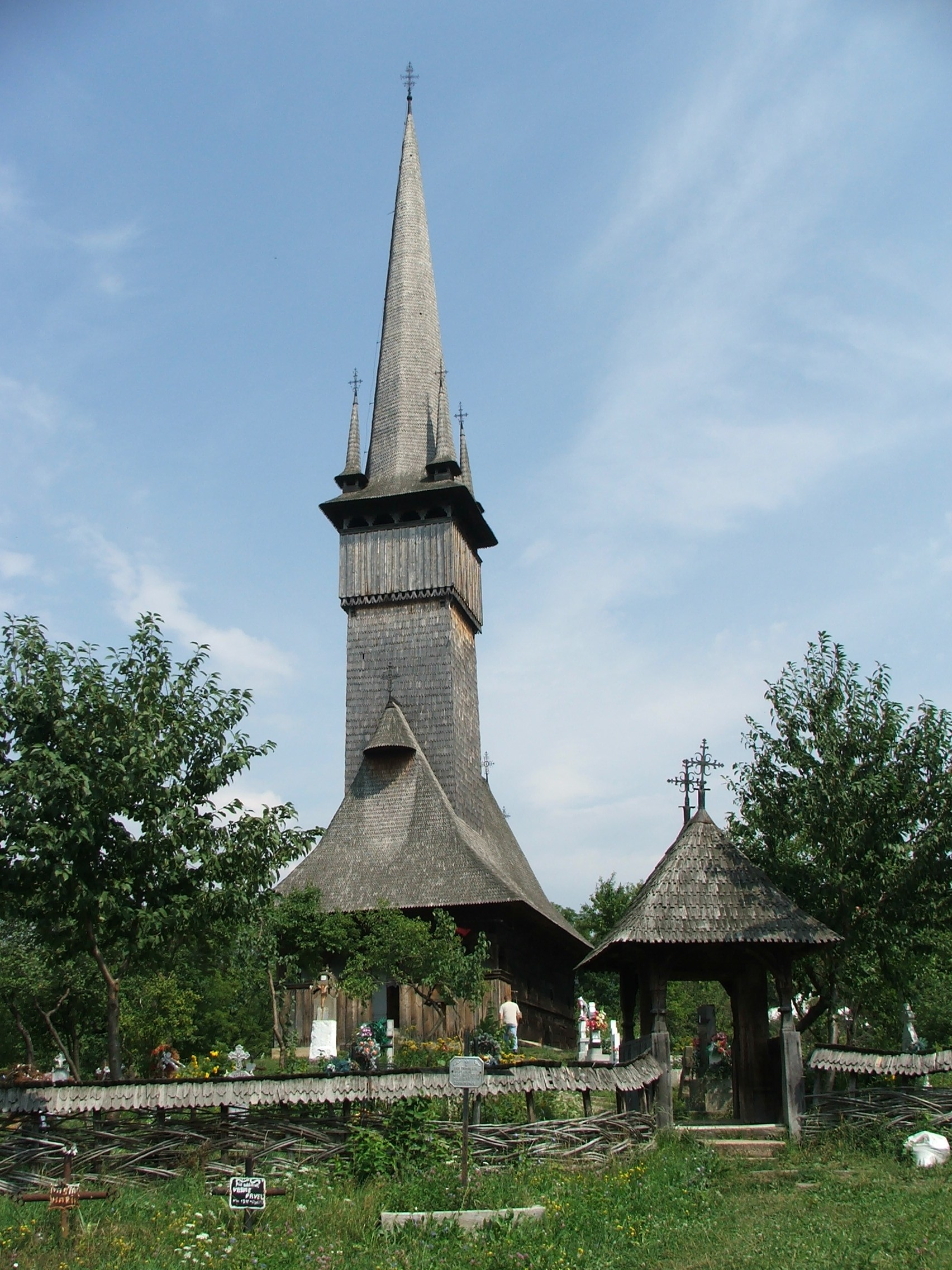
- Wooden church in Plopiș

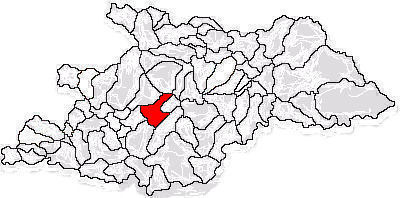
- Location in Maramureș County

- Location in Romania
- Coordinates: 47°37′48″N 23°42′0″E
- Country: Romania
- County: Maramureș

Government
  - Mayor (2020–2024): Ioan Mircea Tentiș (PNL)
- Area: 90.02 km^{2} (34.76 sq mi)
- Elevation: 347 m (1,138 ft)
- Population (2021-12-01): 5,556
  - Density: 61.72/km^{2} (159.9/sq mi)
- Time zone: UTC+02:00 (EET)
  - Summer (DST): UTC+03:00 (EEST)
- Postal code: 437325
- Area code: +40 x59
- Vehicle reg.: MM
- Website: www.comunasisesti.ro

Șișești (Hungarian: Lacfalu) is a commune in Maramureș County, Romania. It is composed of seven villages: Bontăieni (Pusztatelek), Cetățele (Györkefalva), Dănești (Bajfalu), Negreia (Nyegrefalva), Plopiș (Nyárfás), Șișești, and Șurdești (Dióshalom).

The commune is located in the central part of Maramureș County, just south of Baia Sprie and 13 km (8.1 mi) east of the county seat, Baia Mare.

== Demographics ==
Historical population
Year	Pop.	±%
1880	3,071	—
1900	3,503	+14.1%
1910	4,035	+15.2%
1930	3,910	−3.1%
1956	4,691	+20.0%
1977	5,711	+21.7%
1992	5,716	+0.1%
2002	5,479	−4.1%
2011	5,289	−3.5%
2021	5,556	+5.0%
Source: Census data

In 2002, the commune had a population of 5,479, of whom 99.6% were ethnic Romanians. 55.3% were Romanian Orthodox, 40.7% were Greek-Catholic, and 2.5% were Pentecostal. At the 2011 census, the population had decreased to 5,289, while at the 2021 census, there were 5,556 inhabitants.

== Politics ==
Șișești is administrated by a Local Council formed by 15 councilors. The mayor is Ioan Mircea Tentiș, from PNL. Local Council is formed by 10 PNL councilors, 4 PSD, and an independent councilor.

== Villages ==
=== Bontăieni ===
The first mention of the Bontăieni village was in 1648 as Pusztatelek. In 2011, the village population was 249.

=== Cetățele ===
The first mention of the Cetățele village was in 1411 as Gywkefalwa. In 2011, the village population was 624.

=== Dănești ===
The first mention of the Dănești village was in 1405 as Balkonia. In 2011, the village population was 627.

In the interwar period, the teacher Pop Dariu (1877, Măgura Ilvei-1965) carried out a research on the existence of Romanian writings in more than 50 statuary churches. At Dănești (formerly in Satu Mare County) he discovered a notebook where a book on Romanian history was copied after another manuscript from 1861 with an unidentified author. The book was written in winter time by Gabor Poduț, rummaged at the local church, and ended on January 8, 1871.

=== Plopiș ===
Plopiș has a Church of the Archangels Michael and Gabriel, built in 1796; it is one of eight Wooden Churches of Maramureș that are listed by UNESCO as a World Heritage Site.

=== Șurdești ===
Surdești has a Church of the Archangels Michael and Gabriel belonging to the Romanian Greek-Catholic denomination and dates from the 18th century. It is one of eight Wooden Churches of Maramureș listed by UNESCO as a World Heritage Site.

== Natives ==
- Ioan Șișeștean (1936–2011), prelate of the Greek Catholic Church, bishop of the Diocese of Maramureș (1994–2011)
