= Ieud =

- Commune
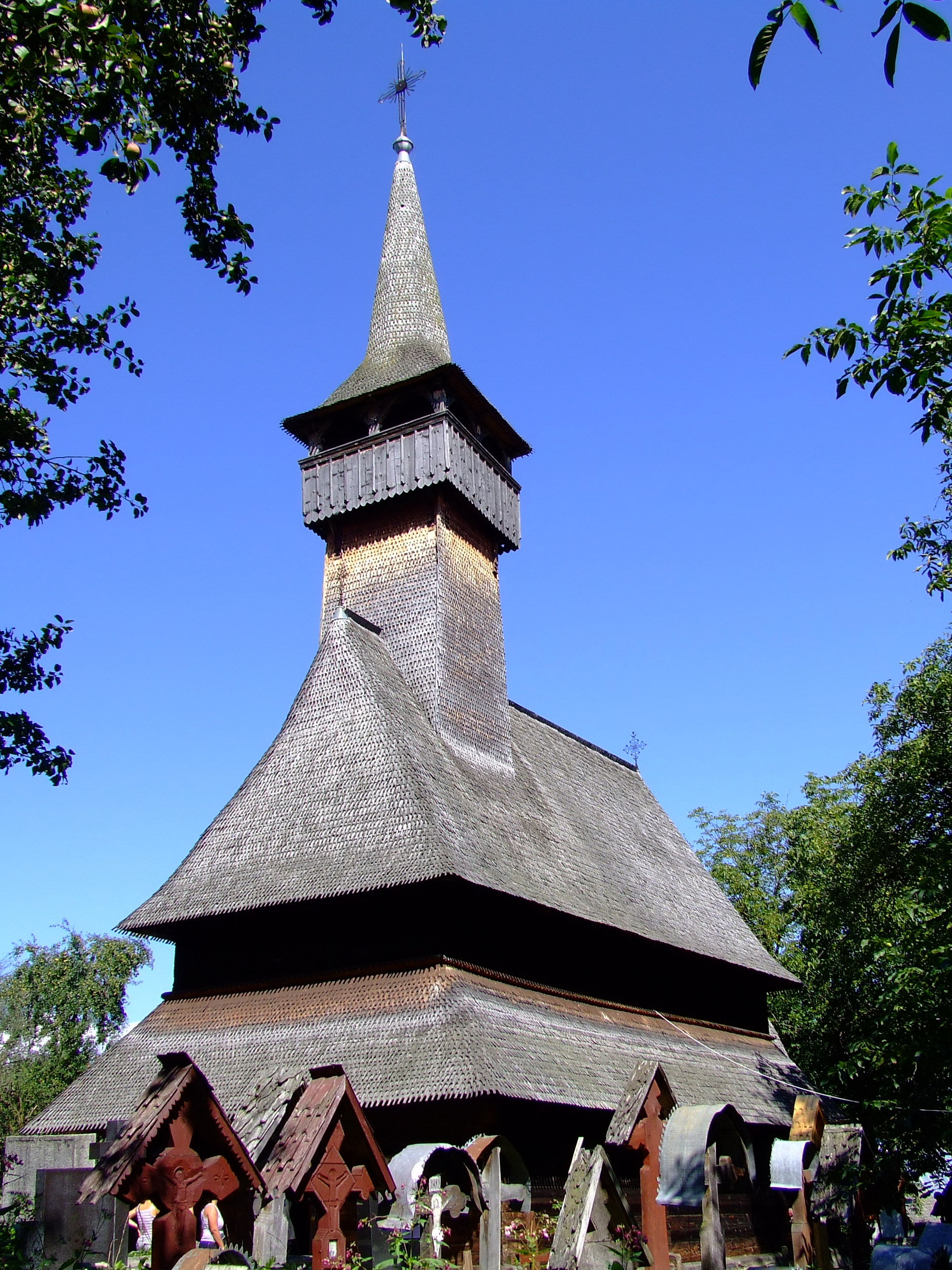
- Church of the Nativity of the Mother of God

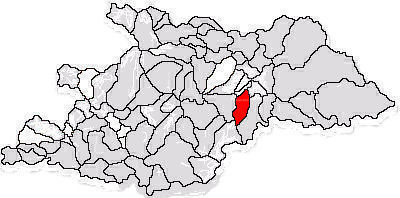
- Location in Maramureș County

- Location in Romania
- Coordinates: 47°40′40″N 24°14′1″E
- Country: Romania
- County: Maramureș

Government
  - Mayor (2024–2028): Nicolae-Traian David (PSD)
- Area: 75.80 km^{2} (29.27 sq mi)
- Elevation: 424 m (1,391 ft)
- Population (2021-12-01): 4,061
  - Density: 53.58/km^{2} (138.8/sq mi)
- Time zone: UTC+02:00 (EET)
  - Summer (DST): UTC+03:00 (EEST)
- Postal code: 437170
- Area code: (+40) 0262
- Vehicle reg.: MM
- Website: comuna-ieud.ro

Ieud (Hungarian: Jód, Yiddish: יועד, romanized: Yoid or Jood) is a commune in Maramureș County, Maramureș, Romania. The commune is situated in the central part of Maramureș County, on the banks of the Ieud, a left tributary of the Iza River. It is composed of a single village, Ieud.

== History ==
The commune was first mentioned in 1391 in a manuscript called the Codicele de la Ieud. This was found in Ieud's Church of the Nativity of the Mother of God. The church is the oldest of eight Wooden Churches of Maramureș that are listed by UNESCO as a World Heritage Site.

Historical population
| Year | Pop. | ±% |
|---|---|---|
| 1880 | 2,078 | — |
| 1900 | 2,594 | +24.8% |
| 1910 | 2,774 | +6.9% |
| 1930 | 2,802 | +1.0% |
| 1956 | 3,715 | +32.6% |
| 1977 | 4,286 | +15.4% |
| 1992 | 4,492 | +4.8% |
| 2002 | 4,223 | −6.0% |
| 2011 | 4,318 | +2.2% |
| 2021 | 4,061 | −6.0% |
Source: Census data

== Natives ==
- Ștefan Hrușcă (born 1957), folk singer
- Victor Mihaly de Apșa (1841–1918), bishop
