= Mittwoch =

Mittwoch is a German word meaning Wednesday.

Other uses for Mittwoch include:

- Eugen Mittwoch (1876-1942), a Jewish German scholar
- Mittwoch aus Licht, an opera by Karlheinz Stockhausen
