= School on the Hill =

Coordinates: 46.2179°N 24.7913°E

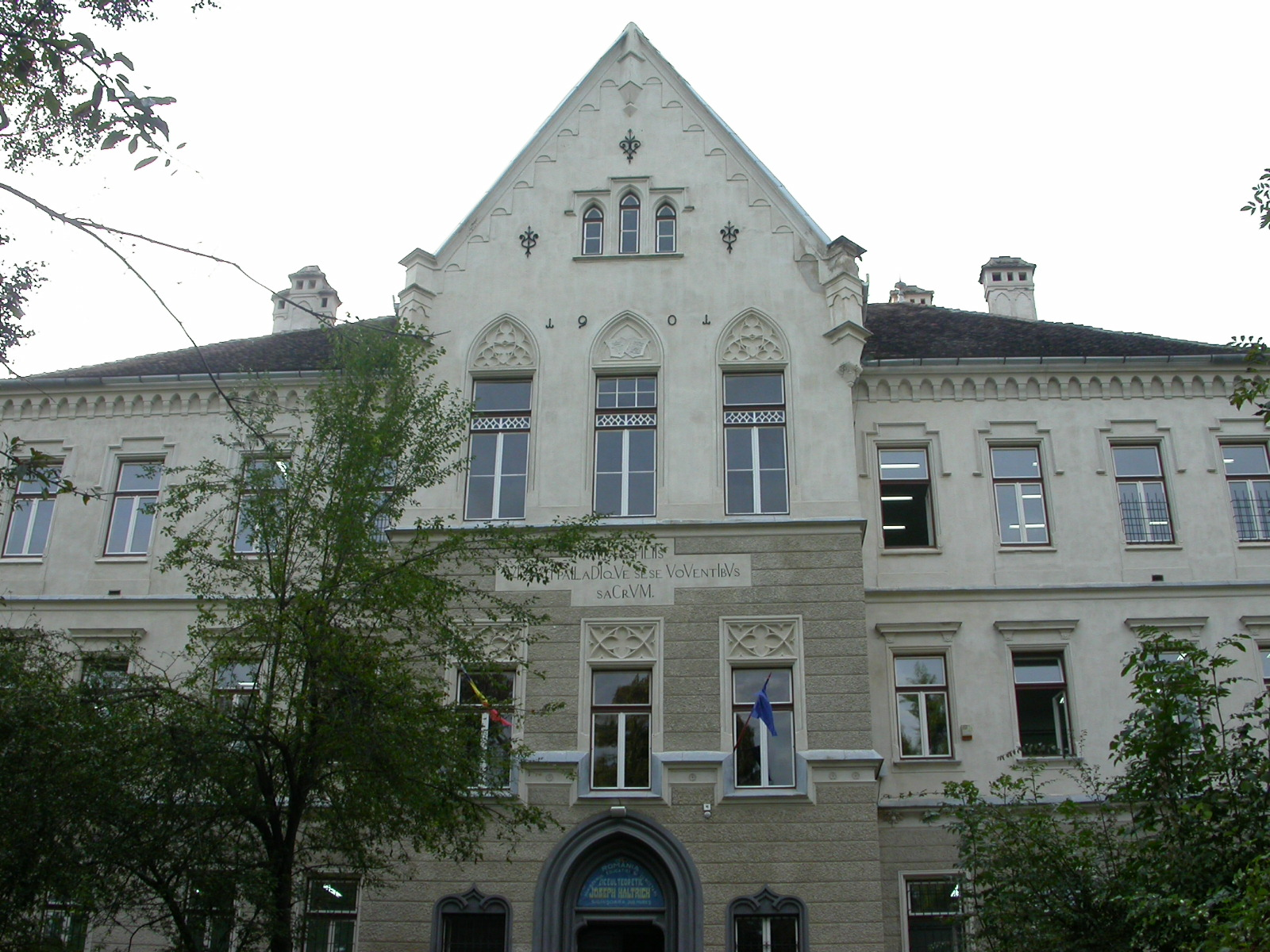
School on the Hill

The adjacent building added in 1619

The School on the Hill (Romanian: Școala din deal; German: Bergschule) is an educational institution in Sighișoara, Romania. It is located next to the covered wooden Stairs, bears Schola Seminarium Rei Publicae and is dated 1619. Its formal name is the Joseph Haltrich High School (Liceul Teoretic Joseph Haltrich).

The school was first mentioned in a document from 1522, which referred to a rector scholae with the academic degree of baccalaureus, to whom the City Council offered a coat worth four guilders for his merits and "to try his best with the youngsters".

== Teachers ==
- Michael Albert
- Josef Haltrich
- Eckhard Hügel
- Georg Friedrich Marienburg

== Alumni ==
- Johann Michael Ackner
- Hugo d’Alési
- Albert Amlacher
- Zaharia Boiu
- Ilarie Chendi
- Remus Răduleț
- Michael von Melas
- Hermann Oberth
- Friedrich Teutsch
- Erwin Wittstock
- Hans Zultner
