= Poienile Izei =

- Commune
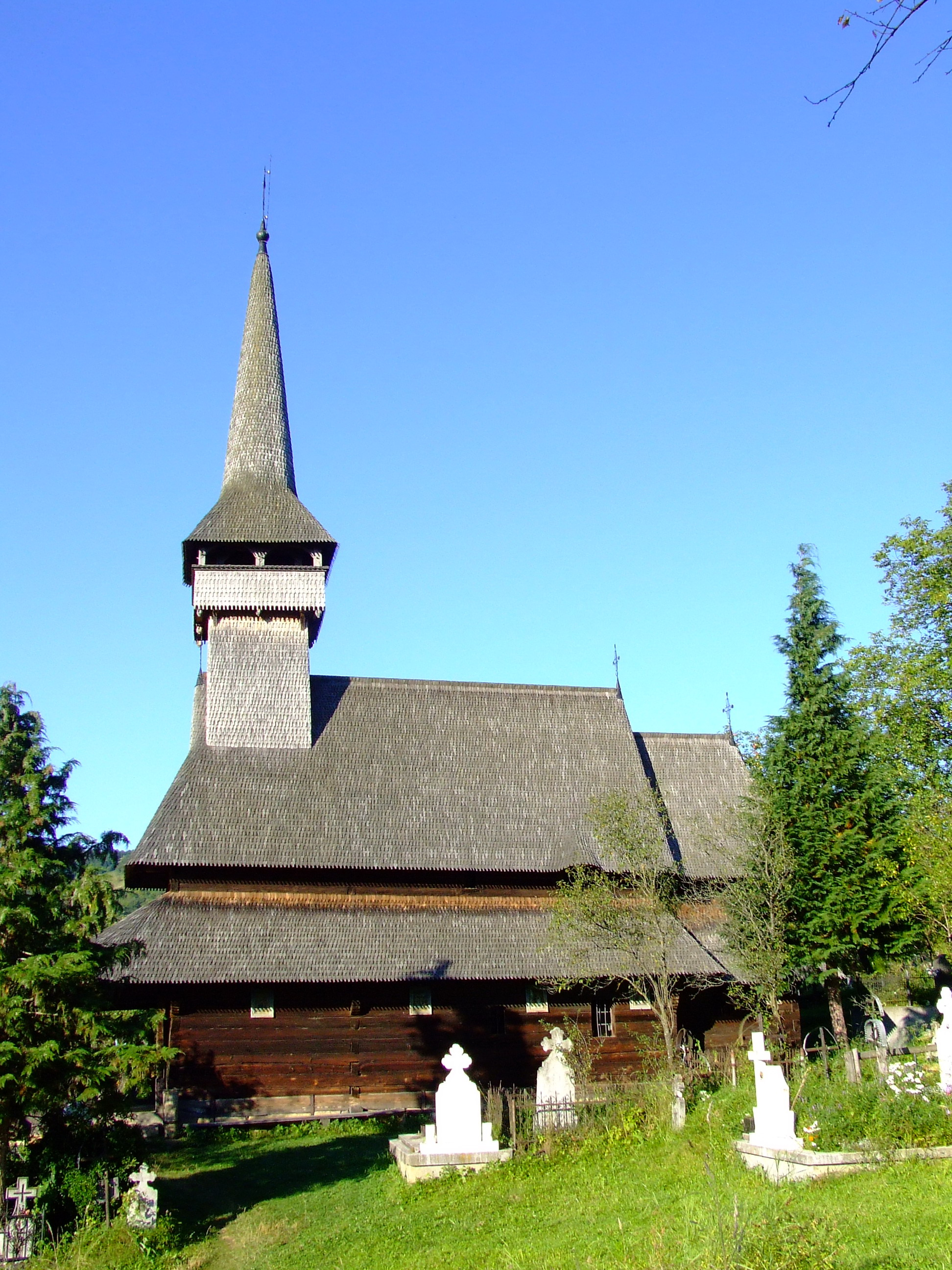
- Poienile Izei wooden church

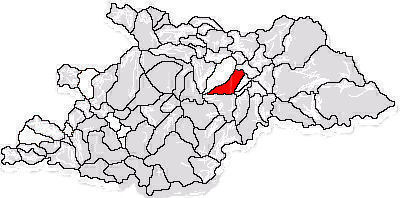
- Location in Maramureș County

- Location in Romania
- Coordinates: 47°42′N 24°7′E
- Country: Romania
- County: Maramureș

Government
  - Mayor (2020–2024): Mirela Bîrlea (Ind.)
- Area: 16.45 km^{2} (6.35 sq mi)
- Elevation: 525 m (1,722 ft)
- Population (2021-12-01): 792
  - Density: 48.1/km^{2} (125/sq mi)
- Time zone: UTC+02:00 (EET)
  - Summer (DST): UTC+03:00 (EEST)
- Postal code: 437215
- Area code: +(40) 262
- Vehicle reg.: MM
- Website: poienileizei.com

Poienile Izei (Hungarian: Sajómező or Hungarian: Sajópolyána, Yiddish: פאליען-גלאד, romanized: Polien-Glod) is a commune in Maramureș County, Maramureș, Romania. The commune is composed of a single village, Poienile Izei, which was part of Botiza Commune until being split off in 1995.

Historical population
Year	Pop.	±%
1880	925	—
1900	942	+1.8%
1910	1,144	+21.4%
1930	1,091	−4.6%
1956	1,171	+7.3%
1977	1,286	+9.8%
1992	1,161	−9.7%
2002	1,028	−11.5%
2011	940	−8.6%
2021	792	−15.7%
Source: Census data

At the 2002 census, the commune had 1,028 inhabitants, of which 99.9% were Romanians and 0.1% Ukrainians, all being Romanian Orthodox. By the 2011 census, the population had decreased to 940. At the 2021 census, Poienile Izei had a population of 792; of those, 97.73% were Romanians.

The commune's Saint Parascheva Church was built in 1700 and is one of eight Wooden churches of Maramureș that are listed by UNESCO as a World Heritage Site.
