= Saint Parascheva Church, Poienile Izei =

Church of the Holy Parasceve
- Biserica de lemn din Poienile Izei
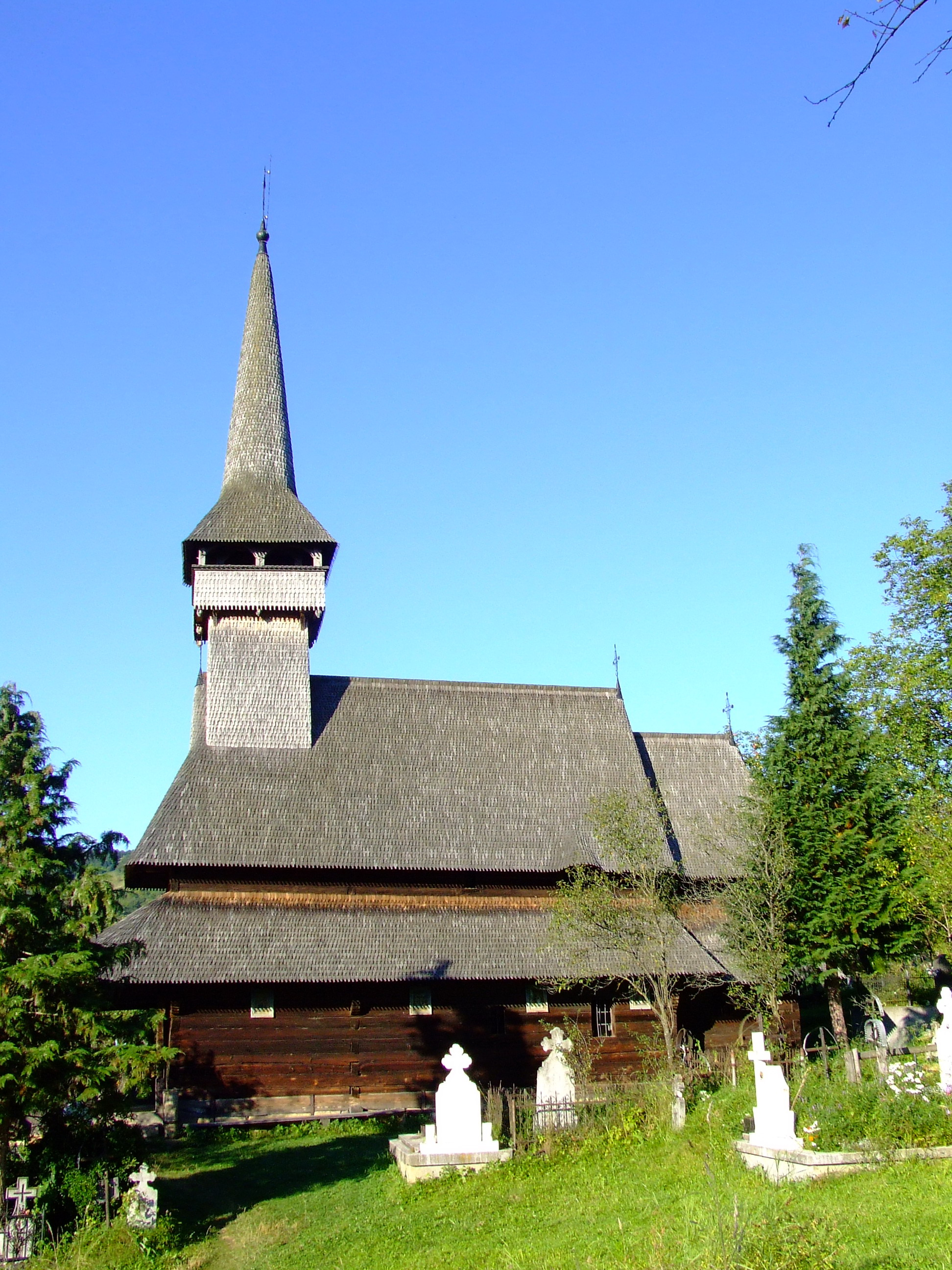
- Church of the Holy Parasceve
- Address: Poienile Izei
- Country: Romania
- Denomination: Eastern Orthodox

History
- Status: active church

Administration
- Diocese: Diocese of Maramureș and Sătmar

UNESCO World Heritage Site
- Part of: Wooden Churches of Maramureş
- Criteria: Cultural: (iv)
- Reference: 904
- Inscription: 1999 (23rd Session)

Saint Parascheva Church is a Romanian Orthodox church in Poienile Izei Commune, Maramureș County, Romania. Built in 1700, it is one of eight buildings that make up the wooden churches of Maramureș UNESCO World Heritage Site, and is also listed as a historic monument by the country's Ministry of Culture and Religious Affairs.
