= Tailors' Tower =

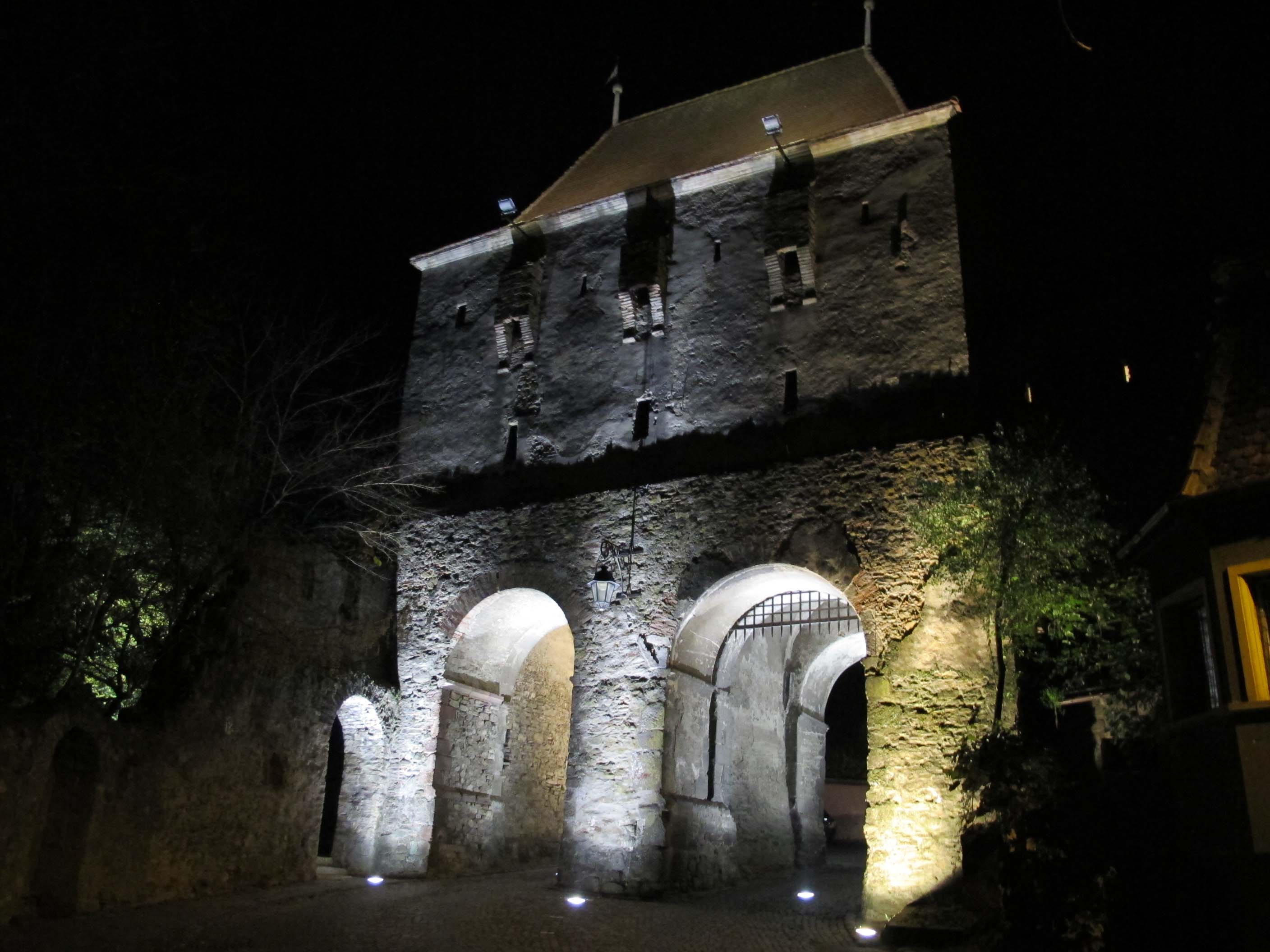
Tailors' Tower

The Tailors' Tower (Romanian: Turnul Croitorilor, German: Schneiderturm of Sighişoara), belonging to Mureș County in Romania was built in the 14th century. It is located opposite to the Clock Tower and it guards the second gateway into the Citadel of Sighişoara.

This tower is considered one of the most beautiful and impressive towers of the fortress due to its massiveness and simplicity. The two passages at the bottom suggest an early dating, probably in the late 12th or 14th century. The two gates were in ancient railings that slides vertically.

== Restorations ==
When the fire started in 1676, inside the tower there were large quantities of grain, projectiles, breastplates, halberds, two long guns and a big amount of gunpowder. The explosion of gunpowder provoked the destruction of the upper side of the tower and of the North-west corridor. The current appearance is due to the restorations occurred after the fire. Immediately after restorations the North-west corridor was turned into a warehouse, at least until 1935; after that the vault was restored and brought back to its original shape and reopened to public.
