= Church of the Archangels Michael and Gabriel, Plopiș =

Church of the Holy Archangels
- Biserica de lemn din Plopiș
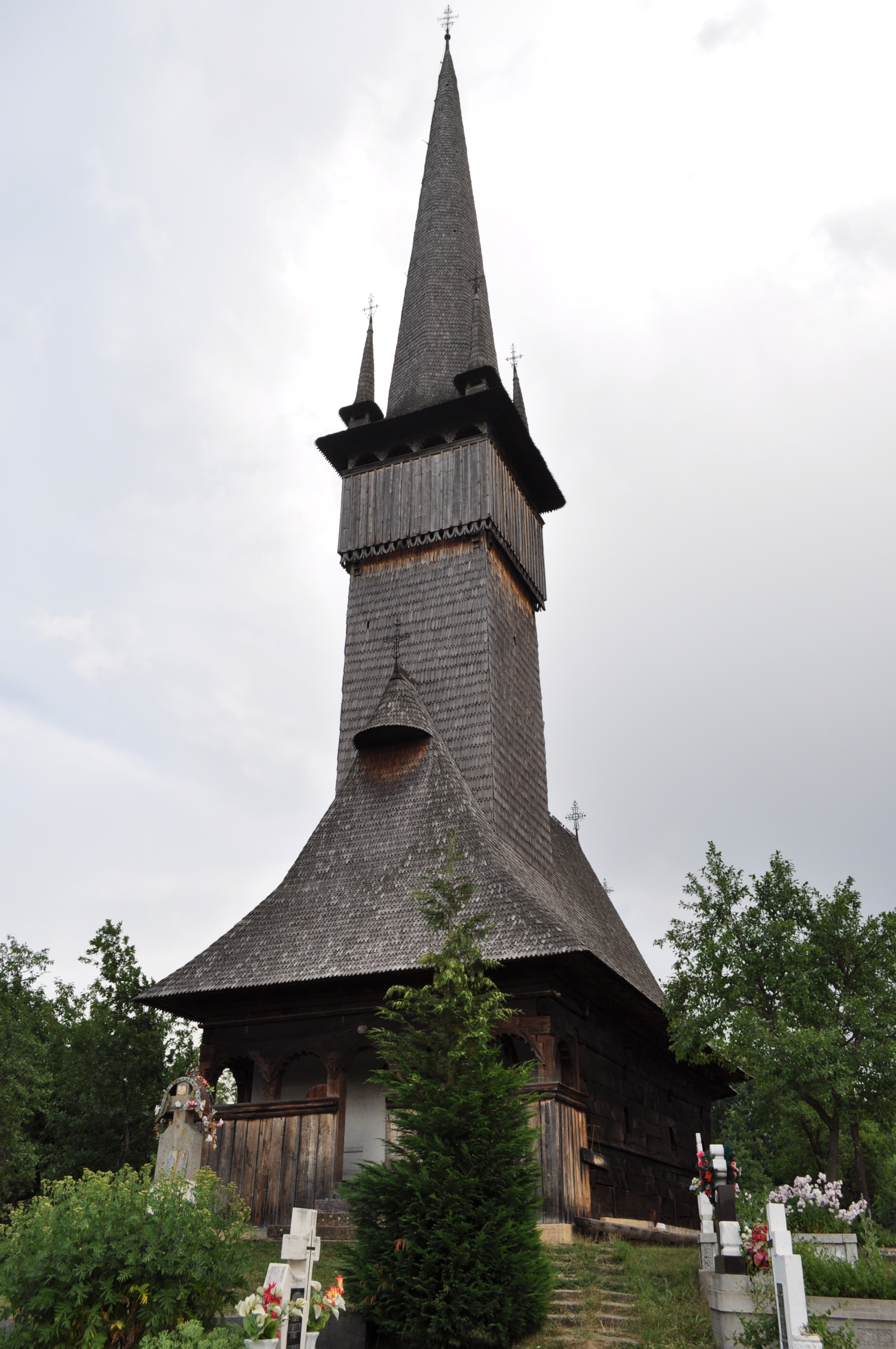
- Church of the Holy Archangels
- Address: Șișești, Maramureș
- Country: Romania
- Denomination: Eastern Orthodox

History
- Status: active church

Administration
- Diocese: Diocese of Maramureș and Sătmar

UNESCO World Heritage Site
- Part of: Wooden Churches of Maramureş
- Criteria: Cultural: (iv)
- Reference: 904-005
- Inscription: 1999 (23rd Session)

The Church of the Archangels Michael and Gabriel is a Romanian Orthodox church in Plopiș village, Șișești Commune, Maramureș County, Romania. Built in 1798, it is one of eight buildings that make up the wooden churches of Maramureș UNESCO World Heritage Site, and is also listed as a historic monument by the country's Ministry of Culture and Religious Affairs.
