= Bâleasa =

- Location within Romania

Location
- Country: Romania
- Counties: Maramureș County

Physical characteristics
- Source: Țibleș Mountains
- Mouth: Iza
  - location: Săliștea de Sus
  - coordinates: 47.6605°N 24.3436°E
- Length: 8 km (5.0 mi)
- Basin size: 18 km^{2} (6.9 sq mi)

Basin features
- Progression: Iza→ Tisza→ Danube→ Black Sea

The Bâleasa is a left tributary of the river Iza in Romania. It discharges into the Iza in Săliștea de Sus. Its length is 8 km (5.0 mi) and its basin size is 18 km^{2} (6.9 sq mi).
