= Săcel oil field =

Oil field in Romania

Săcel
- Country: Romania
- Region: Maramureș County
- Offshore/onshore: onshore
- Operator: Brent Oil

Field history
- Discovery: 1990
- Start of development: 1990
- Start of production: 1991

Production
- Current production of oil: 800 barrels per day (~40,000 t/a)
- Estimated oil in place: 1.3 million tonnes (~ 2×10^{6} m^{3} or 10 million bbl)
- Estimated gas in place: 0.1×10^{9} m^{3} (3.5×10^{9} cu ft)

The Săcel oil field is an oil field located in Săcel, Maramureș County. It was discovered in 1990 and developed by Petrom but the company abandoned the project in 2007 when it was bought by Brent Oil. It began production in 1991 and produces oil. The total proven reserves of the Săcel oil field are around 10 million barrels (1.3 million tonnes), and production centered on 800 barrels per day (130 m^{3}/d).
