= List of cities and towns in Romania =

Towns of Romania

Municipalities of Romania

This is a list of cities and towns in Romania, ordered by population (largest to smallest) according to the 2002, 2011 and 2021 censuses. For the major cities, average elevation is also given. Cities in bold are county capitals. The list includes major cities with the status of municipiu (103 in total), as well as cities and towns with the status of oraș (216 in total).

Romania has 319 cities and towns: one city with over 1 million inhabitants, 17 other cities with more than 100,000 inhabitants, 153 cities with a population between 10,000 and 100,000 inhabitants, 110 towns between 5,000 and 10,000 inhabitants, and 38 towns with less than 5,000 inhabitants.

== Complete list ==
	City (Romanian: municipiu)
	Town (Romanian: oraș)
**Bold**	County capital (Romanian: reședință de județ)

City	County	Population (2021)	Population (2011)	Population (2002)	Elevation (m)	Year status granted (a) or first attested (b)	Image
**Bucharest**	—	1,716,961	1,883,425	1,926,334	85	1459^{b}	
**Cluj-Napoca**	Cluj	286,598	324,576	317,953	360	1316^{a}	
**Iași**	Iași	271,692	290,422	320,888	95	1408^{b}	
**Constanța**	Constanța	263,688	283,872	310,471	25	260 BC^{b} (as Tomis)	
**Timișoara**	Timiș	250,849	319,279	317,660	90	1342^{a}	
**Brașov**	Brașov	237,589	253,200	284,596	625	1235^{b}	
**Craiova**	Dolj	234,140	269,506	302,601	100	1475^{b}	
**Galați**	Galați	217,851	249,432	298,861	55	1445^{b}	
**Oradea**	Bihor	183,105	196,367	206,614	150	1113^{b}	
**Ploiești**	Prahova	180,540	209,945	232,527	150	1596^{b}	
**Brăila**	Brăila	154,686	180,302	216,292	20	1368^{b}	
**Arad**	Arad	145,078	159,074	172,824	107	1028^{b}	
**Pitești**	Argeș	141,275	155,383	168,458	287	1388^{b}	
**Bacău**	Bacău	136,087	144,307	175,500	165	1408^{b}	
**Sibiu**	Sibiu	134,309	147,245	154,892	415	1191^{b}	
**Târgu Mureș**	Mureș	116,033	134,290	149,577	330	1332^{a}	
**Baia Mare**	Maramureș	108,759	123,738	137,976	225	1329^{b}	
**Buzău**	Buzău	103,481	115,494	133,116	95	1431^{b}	
**Râmnicu Vâlcea**	Vâlcea	93,151	98,776	107,656	250	1388^{b}	
**Satu Mare**	Satu Mare	91,520	102,411	115,630	123	1213^{b}	
**Botoșani**	Botoșani	90,010	106,847	115,344	130	1439^{b}	
**Suceava**	Suceava	84,322	92,121	106,138	325	1388^{b}	
**Drobeta-Turnu Severin**	Mehedinți	79,865	92,617	104,035	65	121 AD^{b}; 1833^{a}	
**Piatra Neamț**	Neamț	79,679	85,055	105,499	345	1491^{b}	
**Bistrița**	Bistrița-Năsăud	78,877	75,076	81,467	360	1349^{a}	
**Târgu Jiu**	Gorj	73,545	82,504	96,562	205	1406^{b}	
**Târgoviște**	Dâmbovița	66,965	79,610	89,429	280	1396^{b}	
**Focșani**	Vrancea	66,648	79,315	103,219	55	1575^{b}	
**Tulcea**	Tulcea	65,624	73,707	92,762	30	300 BC–292 BC^{b} (as Aegyssus); 1506^{b} (as Tulcea)	
**Alba Iulia**	Alba	64,227	63,536	66,369	330	1097^{b}	
**Slatina**	Olt	63,487	70,293	79,171	135	1368^{b}	
**Vaslui**	Vaslui	63,035	55,407	70,267	110–170	1375^{b}	
**Reșița**	Caraș-Severin	58,393	73,282	83,985	245	1925^{a}	
**Călărași**	Călărași	58,211	65,181	70,039	13	1534^{b}	
**Giurgiu**	Giurgiu	54,551	61,353	69,587	25	1395^{b}	
Popești-Leordeni	Ilfov	53,434	21,895	15,115		2004^{a}	
**Deva**	Hunedoara	53,113	61,123	69,390	187	1269^{b}	
Bârlad	Vaslui	52,475	55,837	69,183	70–120	1174^{b}	
**Zalău**	Sălaj	52,359	56,202	63,305	275	1473^{a}	
Hunedoara	Hunedoara	50,457	60,525	71,380	240	1265^{b}	
**Sfântu Gheorghe**	Covasna	50,080	56,006	61,512	555	1332^{b}; 1832^{a}	
Roman	Neamț	48,644	50,713	69,483	200	1387^{b}	
Voluntari	Ilfov	47,366	42,944	30,016	57	1864^{b} (the Pipera village), 1921^{b} (Cetatea Voluntărească/the Volunteering Citadel); 1968^{b} (as Voluntari); 2004^{a}	
Turda	Cluj	43,319	47,744	55,770	315	1075^{b}	
**Slobozia**	Ialomița	41,550	45,891	52,677	20	1614^{b}	
**Alexandria**	Teleorman	40,390	45,434	50,591	41	1840^{a}	
Bragadiru	Ilfov	40,080	15,329	8,165	37	2005^{a}	
Mediaș	Sibiu	39,505	47,204	55,203	330	1359^{a}	
Lugoj	Timiș	35,450	40,361	44,571	124	1334^{b} (Sacerdos de Lucas); 1376^{b} (as Castrum Lugas); 1542^{a}	
Medgidia	Constanța	34,612	39,780	43,867	75	1840^{b}; 1968^{a}	
**Miercurea Ciuc**	Harghita	34,484	38,966	41,852	662	1558^{b}	
Năvodari	Constanța	34,398	32,981	32,400	7	1421^{b} (as Kara Koyun); 1927^{b} (as Năvodari); 1968^{a}	
Onești	Bacău	34,005	39,172	51,681	210	1436^{b} (as "Siliștea lui Oană la Trotuș"/the village hearth of Oană upon Trotuș); 1956^{a}	
Pantelimon	Ilfov	32,873	25,596	16,019		2005^{a}	
Tecuci	Galați	32,801	34,871	42,012	50	1435^{b}	
Sighetu Marmației	Maramureș	32,793	37,640	41,246	274	1326^{b}	
Mangalia	Constanța	31,950	36,364	40,037	20	500 BC–400 BC^{b} (as Callatis); 1593^{b} (as Mangalia)	
Dej	Cluj	31,475	33,497	38,478	285	1061^{b}	
Odorheiu Secuiesc	Harghita	31,335	34,257	36,926	477–504	1301^{b} (as Castrum Vduord); 1332–1334^{b} (as Uduorhel village); 1485^{a} (as Oppidum Udvarhely)	
Petroșani	Hunedoara	31,044	37,160	45,447	615	1930^{a}	
Săcele	Brașov	30,920	30,798	29,967		1366^{b}; 1971^{a}	
Pașcani	Iași	30,766	33,745	42,172	250	1419^{b}	
Râmnicu Sărat	Buzău	29,774	33,843	38,805	118	1439^{b}	
Reghin	Mureș	29,742	33,281	36,023	390	1228^{b}	
Mioveni	Argeș	29,317	31,998	35,849	300	1485^{b} (as Colibași); 1989^{a} (as Colibași); 1996^{b} (as Mioveni)	
Câmpina	Prahova	28,993	32,935	38,758	435	1503^{b}/1864^{a}	
Câmpulung	Argeș	27,574	31,767	38,285	580–600	1292–1300^{b}	
Fetești	Ialomița	27,465	30,217	33,197	25	1528^{b}/1934^{a}	
Caracal	Olt	27,403	30,954	34,603	128	1538^{b}	
Borșa	Maramureș	27,711	27,611	27,247	950	1365^{b}/1968^{a}	
Sebeș	Alba	26,490	27,019	29,475		1245^{b}	
Făgăraș	Brașov	26,284	30,714	36,121	430	1222^{b} (the region of Fagar šu/Fogaras river); 1291^{b} (as Fogros); 1310 (the Fogaras wooden fortress)	
Curtea de Argeș	Argeș	25,977	27,359	32,626	420	1330^{b} (as Argeș castle/cetate); 1510^{b} (as The Argeș Court/Curtea de Argeș)	
Huși	Vaslui	25,045	26,266	33,320	120	1494^{b}	
Rădăuți	Suceava	24,292	23,822	32,151	375	1393^{b}	
Sighișoara	Mureș	23,927	28,102	32,287	380	1367^{a}	
Fălticeni	Suceava	23,902	25,723	33,867	220–390	1440^{b}; 1490^{b} (as "Șumuz, that is Fulticeanii" village); 1780^{b} (as Șoldănești town/târg); 1826^{b} (Fălticeni)	
Dorohoi	Botoșani	22,893	24,309	31,073	170	1407^{b}	
Oltenița	Călărași	22,624	24,822	31,434	15	1853^{a}	
Roșiorii de Vede	Teleorman	22,294	27,416	31,873	32	1385^{b}	
Cisnădie	Sibiu	22,277	14,282	17,204	510	1150^{b} (as Ruetel); 1323^{b} (as Heltau); 1948^{a}	
Otopeni	Ilfov	21,750	13,861	10,515	91	2000^{a}	
Caransebeș	Caraș-Severin	21,714	24,689	31,199	220	1289^{b}; 1564^{a}	
Zărnești	Brașov	21,624	23,476	26,520		1373^{b}; 1951^{a}	
Aiud	Alba	21,307	22,876	28,909	260	1293^{b}	
Târnăveni	Mureș	20,604	22,075	29,828	300	1278^{b}/1912^{a}	
Câmpia Turzii	Cluj	20,590	22,223	29,852	300	1925^{a}	
Buftea	Ilfov	20,586	22,178	19,617	110	1968^{a}	
Codlea	Brașov	20,534	21,708	24,814	550	1265^{b}/1950^{a}	
Comănești	Bacău	19,996	19,568	26,237	520	1409^{b}/1952^{a}	
Gherla	Cluj	19,873	20,982	24,232	250	1291^{b}	
Vulcan	Hunedoara	19,772	24,160	33,186	610	1462^{b} (as Wolkan); 1953^{a}	
Moinești	Bacău	19,728	21,787	25,532		1467^{b}	
Petrila	Hunedoara	19,600	22,692	28,742	675	1493^{b}/1956^{a}	
Turnu Măgurele	Teleorman	19,597	24,772	30,187	31	1387^{b}	
Cugir	Alba	19,473	21,376	30,244	304	1330^{b} (as Villa Kudzyr); 1960^{a}	
Carei	Satu Mare	18,957	21,112	25,590	160	1320^{b}/1871^{a}	
Lupeni	Hunedoara	18,699	23,390	31,409	725	1770^{b}/1941^{a}	
Târgu Neamț	Neamț	18,029	18,695	22,634	365	1387^{b}	
Blaj	Alba	17,816	20,630	21,819	260	1271^{b}	
Orăștie	Hunedoara	16,825	18,227	24,354		1224^{b}	
Băicoi	Prahova	16,722	17,981	20,234	310	1597^{b}/1948^{a}	
Târgu Secuiesc	Covasna	16,243	18,491	22,251		1407^{b}	
Balș	Olt	16,114	18,164	23,147	150	1921^{a}	
Motru	Gorj	15,950	19,079	25,860		1385^{b}/1966^{a}	
Ștefănești	Argeș	15,931	14,541	12,983		2004^{a}	
Băilești	Dolj	15,928	17,437	22,231	80	1536^{b}/1921^{a}	
Râșnov	Brașov	15,920	15,022	16,242	650	1331^{b}	
Gheorgheni	Harghita	15,884	18,377	21,245	810	1232^{b}; 1333^{b} (Sacerdos de Giorgio); 1905^{a}	
Salonta	Bihor	15,792	17,735	20,006	90	1606^{b}	
Câmpulung Moldovenesc	Suceava	15,642	16,722	21,862	630	1411^{b}/1866^{a}	
Drăgășani	Vâlcea	15,617	17,871	22,499		1535^{b}	
Moreni	Dâmbovița	15,472	18,687	22,868	472	1584^{b}/1948^{a}	
Vișeu de Sus	Maramureș	15,349	15,037	18,444	427	1365^{b}/1956^{a}	
Adjud	Vrancea	15,178	16,045	20,776	97	1433^{b}	
Vicovu de Sus	Suceava	15,143	13,308	14,125		1436^{b}/2004^{a}	
Cernavodă	Constanța	15,088	17,022	20,514	50	300 BC–100 BC^{b} (as Axiopolis); 1860^{b} (as Černa Voda)	
Filiași	Dolj	15,031	16,900	20,159		1573^{b}/1968^{a}	
Breaza	Prahova	14,871	15,928	18,863	600	1431^{b}/1952^{a}	
Chitila	Ilfov	14,762	14,184	12,643	84	2005^{a}	
Luduș	Mureș	14,757	15,328	18,647		1377^{b}/1960^{a}	
Negrești-Oaș	Satu Mare	14,616	11,867	16,356		1965^{a}	
Măgurele	Ilfov	14,414	11,041	9,200		2005^{a}	
Baia Sprie	Maramureș	14,329	15,476	15,735	500	1329^{b}	
Buhuși	Bacău	14,152	14,562	21,993	235	1438^{b}/1930^{a}	
Ovidiu	Constanța	13,968	13,847	13,458		1989^{a}	
Șimleu Silvaniei	Sălaj	13,948	14,436	17,053		1251^{b}	
Calafat	Dolj	13,807	17,336	21,227	35	1424^{b}	
Marghita	Bihor	13,573	15,770	18,650		1216^{b}/1967^{a}	
Corabia	Olt	13,527	16,441	21,932	35	1596^{b}/1871^{a}	
Urziceni	Ialomița	13,380	15,308	19,088	60	1596^{b}	
Gura Humorului	Suceava	13,278	13,667	16,740		1490^{b}/1904^{a}	
Dărmănești	Bacău	13,069	12,247	14,232		1989^{a}	
Mizil	Prahova	12,962	14,312	17,075	125	1585^{b}/1830^{a}	
Pucioasa	Dâmbovița	12,953	14,254	16,489	350	1649^{b} (as Piatra Pucioasa); 1929^{a}	
Bocșa	Caraș-Severin	12,949	15,842	19,023	170	1333^{b}/1960^{a}	
Bolintin-Vale	Giurgiu	12,806	12,929	11,464	100	1426^{b}/1989^{a}	
Țăndărei	Ialomița	12,761	13,219	14,591		1594^{b}/1968^{a}	
Brad	Hunedoara	12,690	14,495	18,075	278	1445^{b}/1941^{a}	
Toplița	Harghita	12,609	13,929	16,839	650	1567^{b} (as Taplócza); 1956^{a}	
Zimnicea	Teleorman	12,589	14,058	16,787	48	1385^{b} (as Dezimnikos)	
Găești	Dâmbovița	12,583	13,317	16,598		1498^{b}	
Vatra Dornei	Suceava	12,578	14,429	17,864	802	1592^{b}/1907^{a}	
Avrig	Sibiu	12,534	12,815	16,215	350	1364^{b}/1989^{a}	
Ocna Mureș	Alba	12,480	13,036	15,697		1203^{b} (as Uioara); 1956^{a}	
Sântana	Arad	12,460	11,428	12,936		2003^{a}	
Vălenii de Munte	Prahova	12,044	12,257	13,898	350	1431^{b}	
Pecica	Arad	11,950	12,762	13,024		1329^{b}/2004^{a}	
Darabani	Botoșani	11,948	9,893	12,002		1926^{a}/1968^{a}	
Mărășești	Vrancea	11,314	10,671	13,070		1392^{b}	
Simeria	Hunedoara	11,268	12,556	14,571		1449^{b} (as Piskitelep); 1956^{a}	
Beclean	Bistrița-Năsăud	11,260	10,628	12,033	252	1968^{a}	
Târgu Lăpuș	Maramureș	11,163	11,744	14,139		1968^{a}	
Comarnic	Prahova	11,106	11,970	13,532	500–580	1510^{b}/1968^{a}	
Dolhasca	Suceava	11,007	10,298	11,009		2004^{a}	
Sângeorz-Băi	Bistrița-Năsăud	10,931	9,679	10,702			
Scornicești	Olt	10,795	11,766	13,751		1989^{a}	
Săcueni	Bihor	10,720	11,526	11,665		2004^{a}	
Sânnicolau Mare	Timiș	10,627	12,312	13,007	82	1217^{b} (as Sân-Nicolau); 1942^{a}	
Flămânzi	Botoșani	10,561	10,136	11,799		2004^{a}	
Târgu Ocna	Bacău	10,410	11,300	14,184		1774^{a}	
Hârlău	Iași	10,349	10,905	12,260		1968^{a}	
Dăbuleni	Dolj	10,333	12,182	13,888		2004^{a}	
Boldești-Scăeni	Prahova	10,298	11,137	11,505	250–300	1543^{b} (Scăieni), 1600^{b} (Boldești); 1968^{a} (by union)	
Rovinari	Gorj	10,246	11,816	12,603		1981^{a}	
Năsăud	Bistrița-Năsăud	10,215	9,587	11,365			
Jimbolia	Timiș	10,179	10,808	10,497		1950^{a}	
Urlați	Prahova	10,131	10,541	11,858			
Videle	Teleorman	10,107	11,508	12,498		1968^{a}	
Călan	Hunedoara	10,055	11,279	14,714	231	1961^{a}	
Lipova	Arad	10,040	10,313	11,491		1440^{a}	
Beiuș	Bihor	9,745	10,667	12,089	191	1451^{a}	
Drăgănești-Olt	Olt	9,721	10,894	13,181			
Sovata	Mureș	9,703	10,385	12,219		1952^{a}	
Jibou	Sălaj	9,677	10,407	12,283		1205^{b}/1968^{a}	
Aleșd	Bihor	9,662	10,066	10,852	224	1968^{a}	
Târgu Frumos	Iași	9,597	10,475	13,763			
Salcea	Suceava	9,513	9,015	8,719		2004^{a}	
Nehoiu	Buzău	9,464	10,211	12,650		1989^{a}	
Costești	Argeș	9,460	10,375	12,091	200	1535^{b}/1968^{a}	
Odobești	Vrancea	9,423	9,364	8,000		1626^{b}	
Topoloveni	Argeș	9,373	10,219	10,329		1968^{a}	
Oravița	Caraș-Severin	9,346	11,382	15,222			
Titu	Dâmbovița	9,291	9,658	10,711		1968^{a}	
Moldova Nouă	Caraș-Severin	9,278	12,350	15,112		1600^{b}/1956^{a}	
Babadag	Tulcea	9,213	8,940	10,878	30–70	1330–1332^{b} (as Baba-Saltik)	
Covasna	Covasna	9,208	10,114	12,306	550–600	1567^{b}/1952^{a}	
Murfatlar	Constanța	9,173	10,216	10,857		1989^{a}	
Cajvana	Suceava	9,139	6,901	7,263	384	2004^{a}	
Sinaia	Prahova	9,071	10,410	14,636		1880^{a}	
Strehaia	Mehedinți	9,059	10,506	12,564		1921^{a}	
Podu Iloaiei	Iași	8,992	9,573	9,739		2005^{a}	
Ianca	Brăila	8,969	10,343	12,886		1989^{a}	
Valea lui Mihai	Bihor	8,969	9,902	10,665		1844^{a}/1930^{a}/1989^{a}	
Liteni	Suceava	8,878	9,596	9,851		2004^{a}	
Ineu	Arad	8,807	9,260	10,416		1967^{a}	
Cristuru Secuiesc	Harghita	8,797	9,650	11,291	393	1332^{b} (Sacerdos de Sancta Croce); 1956^{a}	
Hațeg	Hunedoara	8,793	9,685	12,507			
Hârșova	Constanța	8,737	9,642	11,198			
Eforie	Constanța	8,630	9,473	9,294			
Orșova	Mehedinți	8,506	10,441	15,379			
Oțelu Roșu	Caraș-Severin	8,497	10,510	13,128		1960^{a}	
Iernut	Mureș	8,473	8,705	9,833		1989^{a}	
Tăuții-Măgherăuș	Maramureș	8,463	7,136	6,713		2004^{a}	
Bușteni	Prahova	8,368	8,894	11,787	880–940	1840^{b}/1946^{a}	
Recaș	Timiș	8,347	8,336	8,560		2004^{a}	
Întorsura Buzăului	Covasna	8,332	7,528	9,081		1968^{a}	
Seini	Maramureș	8,198	8,987	9,439		1989^{a}	
Roznov	Neamț	8,133	8,593	9,171		2003^{a}	
Huedin	Cluj	8,069	9,346	9,955		1961^{a}	
Techirghiol	Constanța	8,061	7,292	7,388			
Tășnad	Satu Mare	8,058	8,631	10,188		1968^{a}	
Mihăilești	Giurgiu	7,760	7,923	7,161			
Baraolt	Covasna	7,730	8,672	10,464	500	1224^{b}	
Șomcuta Mare	Maramureș	7,703	7,565	7,708		2004^{a}	
Bumbești-Jiu	Gorj	7,684	8,932	11,882	400	1989^{a}	
Târgu Cărbunești	Gorj	7,616	8,034	9,338		1968^{a}	
Băbeni	Vâlcea	7,570	8,451	9,475	217	2002^{a}	
Agnita	Sibiu	7,564	8,732	12,115	447	1950^{a}	
Negrești	Vaslui	7,530	8,380	10,481		1968^{a}	
Segarcea	Dolj	7,356	7,019	8,704		1968^{a}	
Călimănești	Vâlcea	7,348	7,622	8,923	260	1386^{b}/1927^{a}	
Curtici	Arad	7,279	7,453	9,762	107	1968^{a}	
Măcin	Tulcea	7,248	8,245	11,803			
Chișineu-Criș	Arad	7,212	7,987	8,724	102	1968^{a}	
Ghimbav	Brașov	7,208	4,698	5,112		2002^{a}	
Budești	Călărași	7,126	7,725	9,596	18	1526^{b}/1989^{a}	
Ulmeni	Maramureș	7,110	7,270	7,153		2004^{a}	
Ungheni	Mureș	7,007	6,945	6,554		2004^{a}	
Panciu	Vrancea	6,921	7,664	9,834		1956^{a}	
Turceni	Gorj	6,891	7,269	8,559		2004^{a}	
Murgeni	Vaslui	6,853	7,119	7,674		2003^{a}	
Buziaș	Timiș	6,834	7,023	8,128	128	1956^{a}	
Amara	Ialomița	6,805	7,345	7,627	30	2004^{a}	
Pâncota	Arad	6,787	6,946	7,418		1968^{a}	
Fundulea	Călărași	6,714	6,851	6,217		1989^{a}	
Nădlac	Arad	6,713	7,398	8,422		1968^{a}	
Tălmaciu	Sibiu	6,711	6,905	9,147		1989^{a}	
Plopeni	Prahova	6,709	7,718	10,083		1968^{a}	
Siret	Suceava	6,708	7,976	10,003			
Uricani	Hunedoara	6,669	8,972	12,177		1965^{a}	
Zlatna	Alba	6,652	7,490	9,254			
Făget	Timiș	6,595	6,761	7,519		1994^{a}	
Câmpeni	Alba	6,569	7,221	8,587	533–618	1565^{b}/1961^{a}	
Vlăhița	Harghita	6,468	6,898	7,392			
Horezu	Vâlcea	6,467	6,263	7,446		1968^{a}	
Săveni	Botoșani	6,447	6,999	8,685		1920^{a}/1968^{a}	
Victoria	Brașov	6,446	7,386	9,059		1954^{a}	
Pogoanele	Buzău	6,384	7,275	7,614		1989^{a}	
Fieni	Dâmbovița	6,378	7,587	8,092		1968^{a}	
Cehu Silvaniei	Sălaj	6,369	7,214	8,468	320	1968^{a}	
Tismana	Gorj	6,359	7,035	7,894		2004^{a}	
Teiuș	Alba	6,308	6,695	7,338		1994^{a}	
Răcari	Dâmbovița	6,306	6,930	6,892		2004^{a}	
Pătârlagele	Buzău	6,276	7,304	8,290		2004^{a}	
Dumbrăveni	Sibiu	6,238	7,388	8,812			
Sărmașu	Mureș	6,186	6,942	7,493		2003^{a}	
Ardud	Satu Mare	6,124	6,231	6,486	180–200	2004^{a}	
Bicaz	Neamț	6,106	6,543	8,911	432	1960^{a}	
Piatra-Olt	Olt	6,000	6,299	6,583		1989^{a}	
Lehliu Gară	Călărași	5,991	6,502	6,667		1989^{a}	
Târgu Bujor	Galați	5,946	6,299	8,044		1968^{a}	
Livada	Satu Mare	5,892	6,773	7,004		2006^{a}	
Însurăței	Brăila	5,870	6,528	7,501		1989^{a}	
Frasin	Suceava	5,817	5,876	6,532		2004^{a}	
Săliște	Sibiu	5,710	5,421	6,092		2003^{a}	
Brezoi	Vâlcea	5,696	6,022	7,589	320	1575^{b}/1968^{a}	
Deta	Timiș	5,670	6,260	6,423		1810^{a}/1968^{a}	
Anina	Caraș-Severin	5,521	7,485	10,594	645–780	1952^{a}	
Gătaia	Timiș	5,473	5,861	8,103		2004^{a}	
Ciacova	Timiș	5,434	5,348	7,285	84	1335^{b}/2004^{a}	
Bălan	Harghita	5,414	6,115	9,295	950–1000	1968^{a}	
Miercurea Nirajului	Mureș	5,414	5,554	5,824		2003^{a}	
Sebiș	Arad	5,410	5,979	6,829			
Ștei	Bihor	5,398	6,529	9,466		1956^{a}	
Novaci	Gorj	5,276	5,431	6,151		1968^{a}	
Potcoava	Olt	5,229	5,743	6,111		2004^{a}	
Broșteni	Suceava	5,179	5,506	6,603	640	2004^{a}	
Geoagiu	Hunedoara	5,087	5,294	6,290		2000^{a}	
Vânju Mare	Mehedinți	5,078	5,311	7,074		1968^{a}	
Ștefănești	Botoșani	5,032	5,314	5,628		2004^{a}	
Rupea	Brașov	4,907	5,269	6,246		1951^{a}	
Sângeorgiu de Pădure	Mureș	4,875	5,166	5,492		2003^{a}	
Săliștea de Sus	Maramureș	4,856	4,893	5,196		1365^{b}/2004^{a}	
Slănic	Prahova	4,669	6,034	7,249		1892^{a}	
Milișăuți	Suceava	4,657	5,005	8,433		2004^{a}	
Fierbinți-Târg	Ialomița	4,620	4,969	5,253		2004^{a}	
Negru Vodă	Constanța	4,616	5,088	5,529			
Copșa Mică	Sibiu	4,570	5,404	5,157	287	1402^{b}/1961^{a}	
Baia de Aramă	Mehedinți	4,478	5,349	5,724	275	1968^{a}	
Isaccea	Tulcea	4,408	5,026	5,374			
Abrud	Alba	4,360	5,072	6,803	600–777	106–275 (as Abruttus/Alburnus Minor); 1271^{b} (as Abruth/terra Obruth)	
Bechet	Dolj	4,355	3,657	3,864	15	2004^{a}	
Cavnic	Maramureș	4,264	4,976	5,494	650–700	1968^{a}	
Bălcești	Vâlcea	4,235	4,864	5,780	170	2002^{a}	
Berbești	Vâlcea	4,231	4,836	5,704	340–350	2003^{a}	
Bucecea	Botoșani	4,171	4,274	5,128	268	1434^{b}/2004^{a}	
Predeal	Brașov	4,020	4,755	5,615	1030	1935^{a}	
Slănic Moldova	Bacău	4,011	4,198	5,375			
Țicleni	Gorj	3,934	4,414	5,205		1968^{a}	
Azuga	Prahova	3,901	4,440	6,119	895–950	1948^{a}	
Băile Herculane	Caraș-Severin	3,787	5,008	6,051	160	153^{b} (as Aquae Herculis); 1951^{a}	
Băile Olănești	Vâlcea	3,750	4,186	4,814	430–475	1527^{b}	
Miercurea Sibiului	Sibiu	3,619	3,910	4,063		2004^{a}	
Ocna Sibiului	Sibiu	3,434	3,562	4,184			
Aninoasa	Hunedoara	3,369	4,360	6,108	650	1989^{a}	
Dragomirești	Maramureș	3,154	3,213	3,132		2004^{a}	
Ocnele Mari	Vâlcea	3,134	3,309	3,591		1960^{a}	
Sulina	Tulcea	3,118	3,663	5,140			
Baia de Arieș	Alba	3,035	3,461	4,877	495–1256	1998^{a}	
Făurei	Brăila	3,008	3,592	4,626		1968^{a}	
Căzănești	Ialomița	2,938	3,271	3,641	17	2004^{a}	
Berești	Galați	2,473	2,916	3,926	140	1968^{a}	
Solca	Suceava	2,405	2,188	4,687		1926^{a}	
Borsec	Harghita	2,391	2,585	3,109	860–880	1956^{a}	
Băile Govora	Vâlcea	2,158	2,449	3,147	360–380	1927^{a}	
Vașcău	Bihor	2,025	2,315	3,032		1956^{a}	
Nucet	Bihor	1,987	2,165	2,851		1956^{a}	
Băile Tușnad	Harghita	1,372	1,641	1,802	650	1968^{a}	

== See also ==
- Metropolitan areas in Romania
- List of cities in Europe
- List of city listings by country
