= Valea Carelor River =

Valea Carelor River may refer to one of the following rivers in Romania:

- Valea Carelor, a tributary of the Iza in Maramureș County
- Valea Carelor, a tributary of the Someșul Mare in Bistrița-Năsăud County
