= Săcel =

Săcel may refer to several places in Romania:

- Săcel, a commune in Harghita County
- Săcel, a commune in Maramureș County
- Săcel, a village in Băișoara Commune, Cluj County
- Săcel, a village in Sântămăria-Orlea Commune, Hunedoara County
- Săcel, a district in the town of Săliște, Sibiu County

== See also ==
- Săcele
