= Baicu =

Baicu may refer to:

== Rivers ==
- Baicu (Iza), tributary of the river Iza in Romania
- Baicu, tributary of the river Șes in Romania

== People ==
- Ilie Baicu (born 1974), Romanian football player
- Mihai Baicu (1975–2009), Romanian football player
- Raoul Baicu (born 2000), Romanian football player
