= Șugău (disambiguation) =

Șugău may refer to the following places in Romania:

- Șugău, a tributary of the Iza in Maramureș County
- Șugău, a tributary of the Bicaz in Neamț County
- Șugău or Șugo, a tributary of the Olt in Harghita County
- Șugău or Șugo, alternative names for the Pârâul Șoptitor in Covasna County
- Șugău, a village in the municipality of Sighetu Marmației, Maramureș County
