= Valea Păstăilor =

Valea Păstăilor Valea Iepii, Pârâul Iepii
- Location within Romania

Location
- Country: Romania
- Counties: Maramureș County
- Villages: Iapa, Valea Hotarului

Physical characteristics
- Mouth: Iza
  - coordinates: 47°56′14″N 23°51′05″E
- Length: 8 km (5.0 mi)
- Basin size: 22 km^{2} (8.5 sq mi)

Basin features
- Progression: Iza→ Tisza→ Danube→ Black Sea

The Valea Păstăilor (also: Valea Iepii, Pârâul Iepii) is a left tributary of the Iza in Maramureș County, Romania. It discharges into the Iza close to its confluence with the Tisza, in Valea Hotarului. Its length is 8 km (5.0 mi) and its basin size is 22 km^{2} (8.5 sq mi).

== Maps ==
- Harta Munții Gutâi (online version)
