= Șugău =

- Location within Romania

Location
- Country: Romania
- Counties: Maramureș County
- Villages: Șugău

Physical characteristics
- Mouth: Iza
  - location: Vadu Izei
  - coordinates: 47.8888°N 23.9217°E
- Length: 8 km (5.0 mi)
- Basin size: 56 km^{2} (22 sq mi)

Basin features
- Progression: Iza→ Tisza→ Danube→ Black Sea
- Tributaries
  - left: Valea Blondă
  - right: Turcatele

The Șugău is a left tributary of the river Iza in Romania. It discharges into the Iza near Vadu Izei. Its length is 8 km (5.0 mi) and its basin size is 56 km^{2} (22 sq mi).
