= Rozavlea =

- Commune
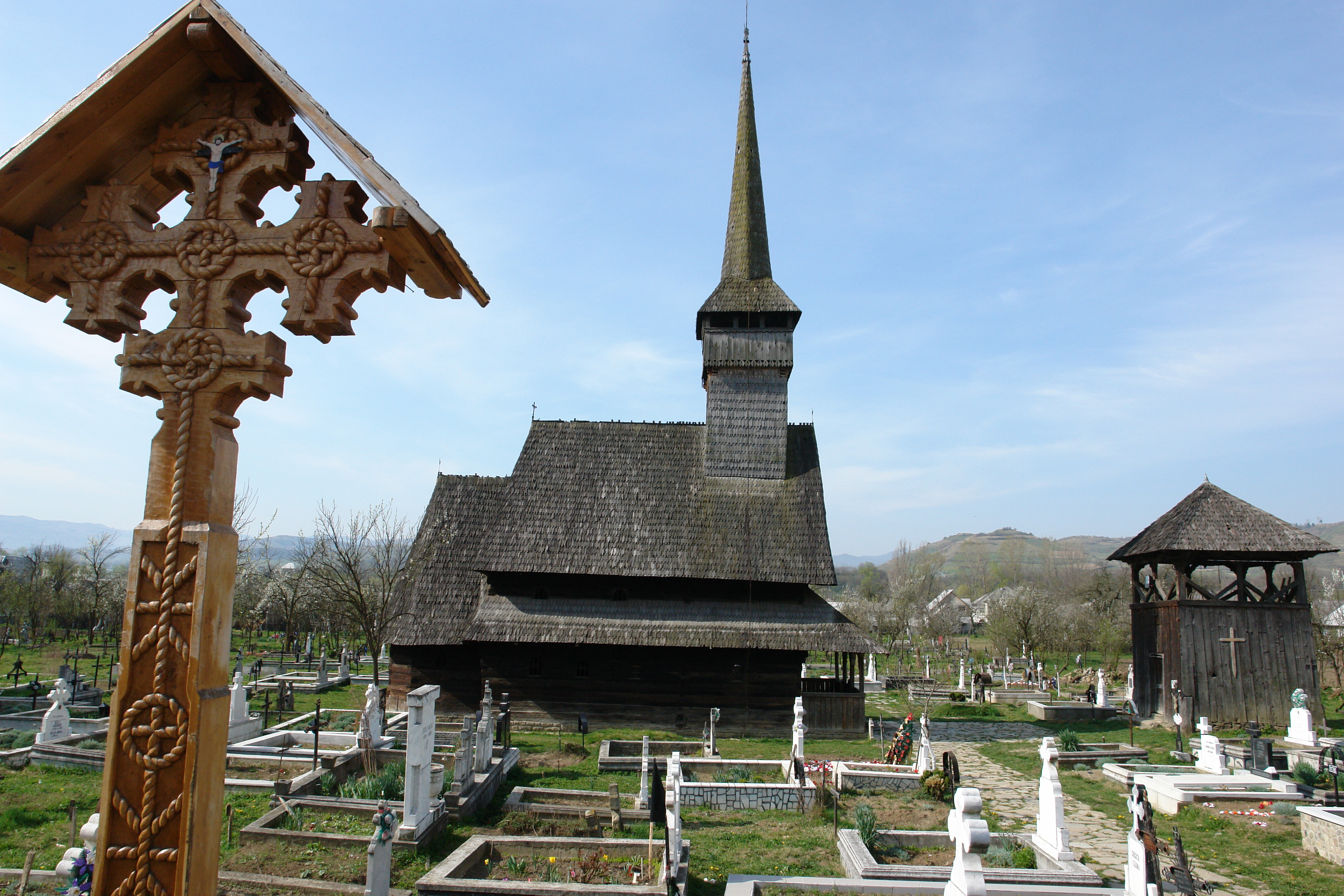
- Wooden church in Rozavlea

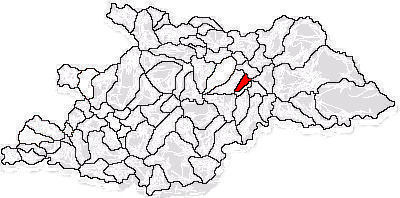
- Location in Maramureș County

- Location in Romania
- Coordinates: 47°44′N 24°13′E
- Country: Romania
- County: Maramureș

Government
  - Mayor (2020–2024): Vasile Mîrza (PNL)
- Area: 43.23 km^{2} (16.69 sq mi)
- Elevation: 370 m (1,210 ft)
- Population (2021-12-01): 2,986
  - Density: 69.07/km^{2} (178.9/sq mi)
- Time zone: UTC+02:00 (EET)
  - Summer (DST): UTC+03:00 (EEST)
- Postal code: 437255
- Area code: (+40) 02 62
- Vehicle reg.: MM
- Website: primaria-rozavlea.ro

Rozavlea (Hungarian: Rozávlya or Rosália, Yiddish: ריזאוולייה, romanized: Rezavlia) is a commune in Maramureș County, Maramureș, Romania. It is composed of two villages, Rozavlea and Sâlța (established in 2006).

The commune is located in the east-central part of Maramureș County, on the right bank of the Iza River. It lies at an altitude of 370 m (1,210 ft), in the western foothills of the Maramureș Mountains. The county seat, Baia Mare, is some 75 km (47 mi) to the west.

Historical population
Year	Pop.	±%
2002	3,611	—
2011	3,085	−14.6%
2021	2,986	−3.2%
Source: Census data

At the 2021 census, Rozavlea had a population of 2,986, with an absolute majority (91.5%) of ethnic Romanians.
