= Iza (river) =

Tributary of the Tisa River in Romania

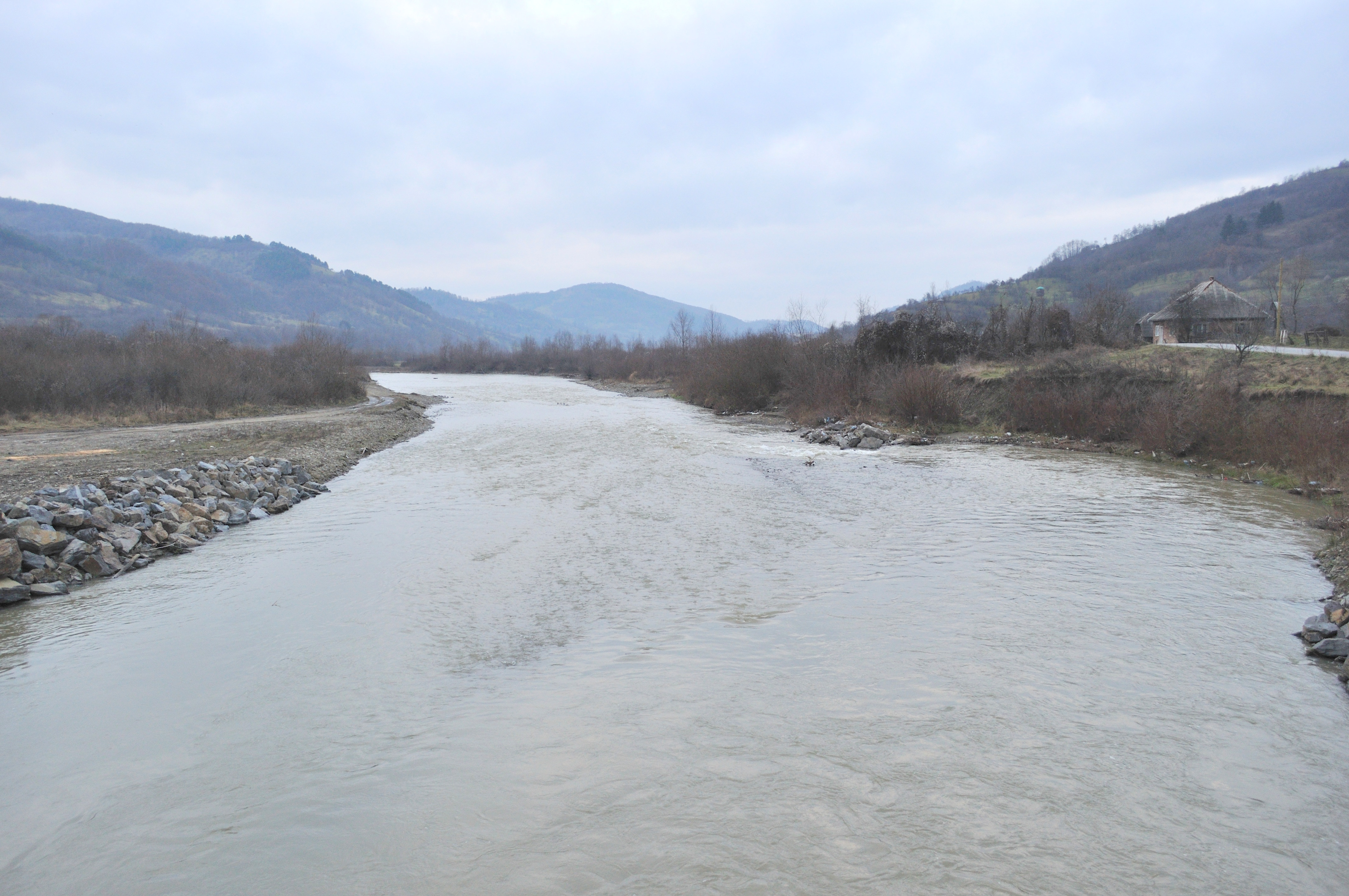
- Iza river at Strâmtura, Maramureș county

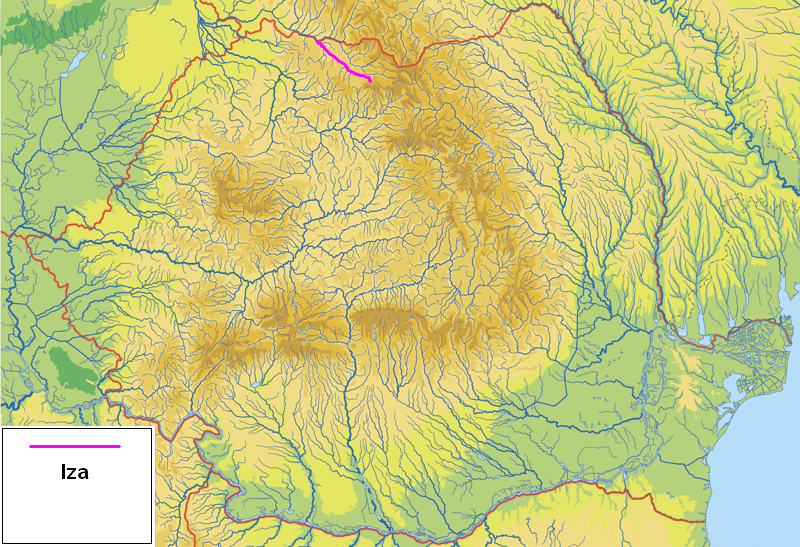

Location
- Country: Romania
- Counties: Maramureș
- Towns: Săliștea de Sus, Sighetu Marmației

Physical characteristics
- Source: Rodna Mountains
  - elevation: 1,380 m (4,530 ft)
- Mouth: Tisa
  - location: Sighetu Marmației
  - coordinates: 47°56′4″N 23°51′11″E
  - elevation: 268 m (879 ft)
- Length: 77.6 km (48.2 mi)
- Basin size: 1,293.5 km^{2} (499.4 mi^{2})
- Discharge
  - location: Sighetu Marmației (near mouth)
  - average: (Period: 1971–2000)18.74 m^{3}/s (662 cu ft/s) 16.3 m^{3}/s (580 cu ft/s)

Basin features
- Progression: Tisza→ Danube→ Black Sea
- Tributaries
  - left: Baicu, Mara

The Iza is a left tributary of the river Tisa in northern Romania. Its source is in the Rodna Mountains. It flows into the Tisa near the city Sighetu Marmației. It passes through the communes Săcel, Săliștea de Sus, Dragomirești, Bogdan Vodă, Șieu, Rozavlea, Strâmtura, Bârsana, Oncești, Vadu Izei, and Sighetu Marmației. Its drainage basin covers an area of 1,293 km^{2} (499 sq mi). Its length is 80 km (49.7 mi).

== Tributaries ==
The following rivers are tributaries to the river Iza:

- Left: Valea Carelor, Bistrița, Bâleasa, Baicu, Slatina, Ieud, Gârbova Mare, Botiza, Sâlța, Slătioara, Valea Morii, Văleni, Mara, Șugău, Valea Păstăilor
- Right: Valea Satului, Valea Muntelui, Valea Caselor, Valea Porcului, Rona
