= Săcel, Maramureș =

Săcel
- Commune
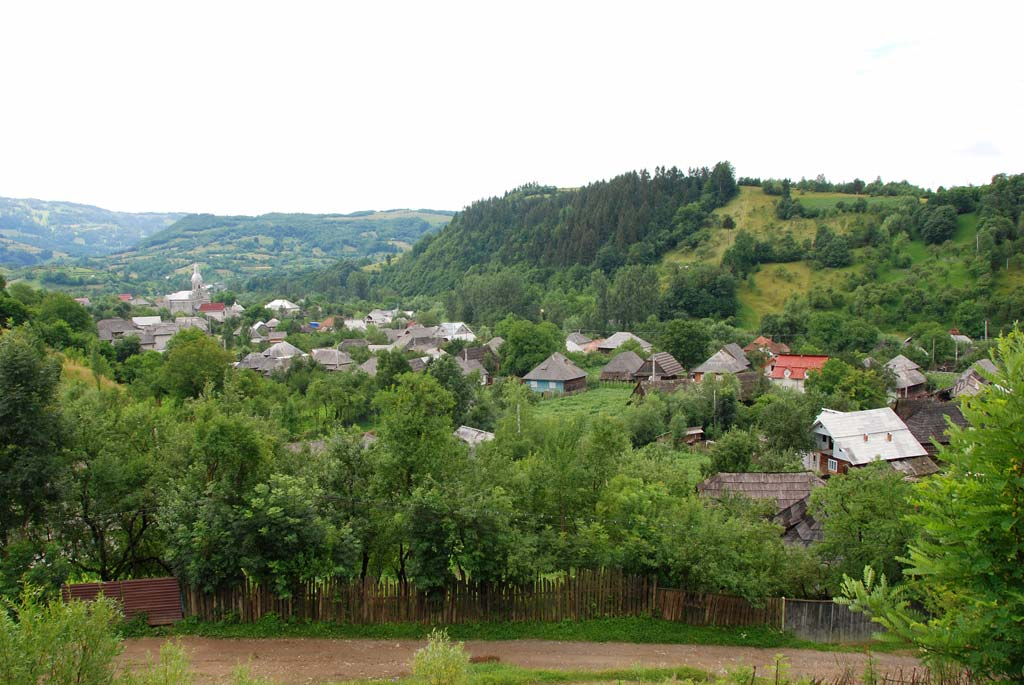
- View of the village

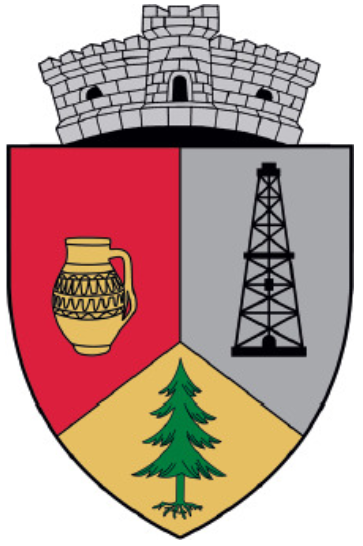
- Coat of arms

- Location in Maramureș County

- Location in Romania
- Coordinates: 47°38′N 24°26′E
- Country: Romania
- County: Maramureș

Government
  - Mayor (2024–2028): Ionuț-Gabriel Dologa (PNL)
- Area: 79.89 km^{2} (30.85 sq mi)
- Elevation: 400 m (1,300 ft)
- Highest elevation: 553 m (1,814 ft)
- Population (2021-12-01): 3,142
  - Density: 39.33/km^{2} (101.9/sq mi)
- Time zone: UTC+02:00 (EET)
  - Summer (DST): UTC+03:00 (EEST)
- Postal code: 437290
- Area code: (+40) 02 62
- Vehicle reg.: MM
- Website: sacel-maramures.ro

Săcel (Hungarian: Izaszacsal (after 1901), Szacsal (until 1901); Yiddish: סיטשל, romanized: Sicsel or Sitshl) is a commune in Maramureș County, Maramureș, Romania. Composed of a single village, Săcel, it is the last locality up the Iza River Valley. From here one can get to the Vișeu Valley through Dealul Moiseiului Pass (towards the northeast) and to Transylvania (specifically Năsăud, towards the south) through Dealul Ștefăniței Pass, which separates the Țibleș and Rodna mountains.

The commune is located in the southeastern part of Maramureș County, on the border with Bistrița-Năsăud County and the Romuli commune. It also borders the Moisei commune, the town of Vișeu de Sus and the town of Săliștea de Sus. It lies 60 km (37 mi) southeast of Sighetu Marmației and 100 km (62 mi) east of the county seat, Baia Mare, and is crossed by national road DN17C, which starts in Bistrița, 72 km (45 mi) to the south and ends in DN18 near Moisei, 10 km (6.2 mi) to the northeast.

Historical population
Year	Pop.	±%
1880	1,957	—
1900	2,630	+34.4%
1910	3,040	+15.6%
1930	3,561	+17.1%
1956	4,379	+23.0%
1977	4,275	−2.4%
1992	4,126	−3.5%
2002	3,779	−8.4%
2011	3,500	−7.4%
2021	3,142	−10.2%
Source: Census data

== Săcel pottery ==
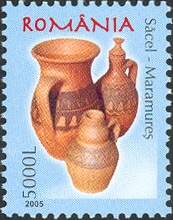
Stamp of Romania (2005) with Săcel pottery

Săcel is famous for its red, unglazed pottery produced by ancient, Dacian techniques that date to more than 2000 years ago. In the 21st century, an ancient Roman-type oven or kiln is used to cure the clay. Săcel pots are manufactured in Dacian style and they are ornamented using mineral elements.
