= Dragomirești, Maramureș =

Dragomirești
- Town
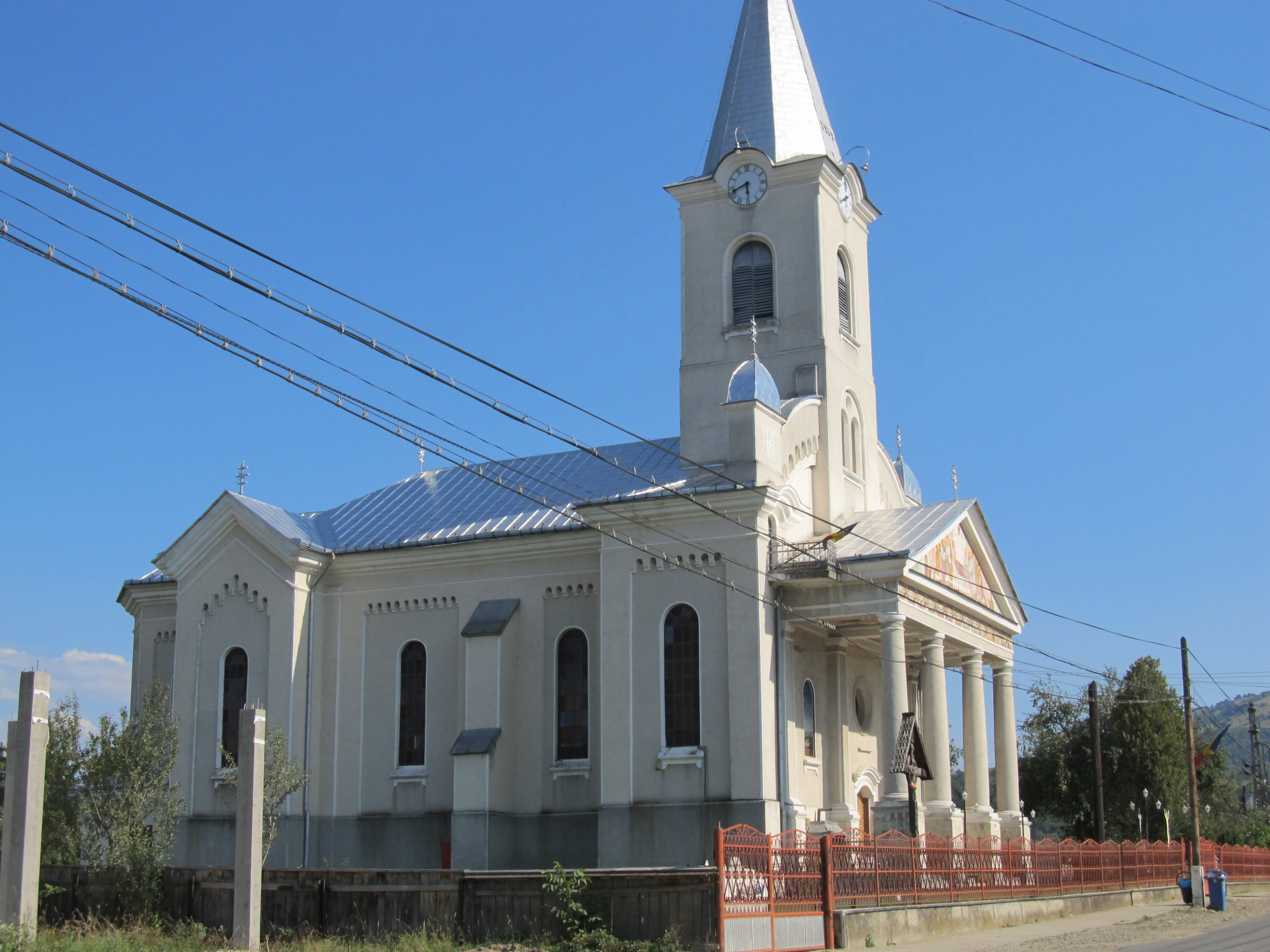
- Church of the Assumption of the Virgin Mary, Dragomirești

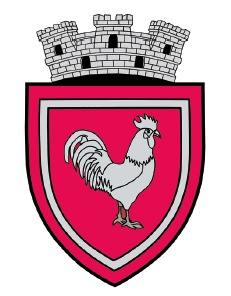
- Coat of arms

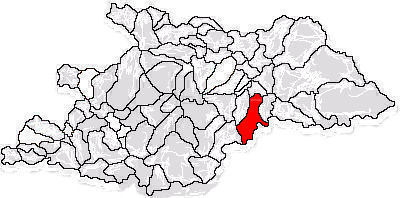
- Location in Maramureș County

- Location in Romania
- Coordinates: 47.6669°N 24.2914°E
- Country: Romania
- County: Maramureș

Government
  - Mayor (2024–2028): Vasile Țiplea (PSD)
- Area: 101.09 km^{2} (39.03 sq mi)
- Elevation: 228 m (748 ft)
- Population (2021-12-01): 3,154
  - Density: 31.20/km^{2} (80.81/sq mi)
- Time zone: UTC+02:00 (EET)
  - Summer (DST): UTC+03:00 (EEST)
- Postal code: 437140
- Area code: (+40) 02 62
- Vehicle reg.: MM
- Website: www.dragomiresti-maramures.ro

Dragomirești (Hungarian: Dragomérfalva or Dragomérfalu; Yiddish: דראגאמירעשט, romanized: Dragomiresht; German: Dragomir) is a town in Maramureș County, Maramureș, Romania. It was declared a town in 2004.

== Geography ==
The town lies at the foot of the Țibleș Mountains, on the banks of the Iza River and its tributary, the Baicu. It is located in the southeastern part of the county, on the border with Bistrița-Năsăud County, about 90 km (56 mi) east of the county seat, Baia Mare.

== History ==
Among the first Jews who settled in Dragomirești was R. Shemuel Stern of the Kosov Hasidic dynasty, in 1780. He was followed by other Hasidim from Galicia who worked in his lumber mills. By 1920, there were 756 Jews, accounting for 28% of the population. After the 1940 Second Vienna Award granted Northern Transylvania to Hungary, local Jews aged 20 to 40 were drafted into labor battalions in Ukraine. On April 15, 1944, 2000 Jews, including from nearby villages, were ghettoized. A month later, they were made to go to Vișeu de Sus rail station: males aged 12 to 60 on foot; women, children and elderly men in wagons. From Vișeu, trains took them to Auschwitz concentration camp.

== Demographics ==
Historical population
Year	Pop.	±%
1880	1,546	—
1900	2,194	+41.9%
1910	2,605	+18.7%
1930	3,152	+21.0%
1956	3,221	+2.2%
1977	3,519	+9.3%
1992	3,510	−0.3%
2002	3,132	−10.8%
2011	3,213	+2.6%
2021	3,154	−1.8%
Source: Census data

At the 2011 census, Dragomirești had 3,213 inhabitants, of which 99.5% were ethnic Romanians and 0.4% Roma; 94.8% were Romanian Orthodox and 4.9% Greek-Catholic. At the 2021 census, the commune had a population of 3,154; of those, 97% were Romanians.

== Natives ==
- Vasile Bizău (b. 1969), Romanian bishop of the Greek-Catholic Church.
- János Bud (1880–1950), Hungarian politician, Minister of Finance in 1924–1928.
