= Baicu (Iza) =

Baicu Boicu
- Location within Romania

Location
- Country: Romania
- Counties: Maramureș County

Physical characteristics
- Mouth: Iza
  - location: Dragomirești
  - coordinates: 47.6804°N 24.2827°E
- Length: 19 km (12 mi)
- Basin size: 100 km^{2} (39 sq mi)

Basin features
- Progression: Iza→ Tisza→ Danube→ Black Sea
- Tributaries
  - right: Călimaș, Idișor

The Baicu or Boicu is a left tributary of the river Iza in Romania. It discharges into the Iza near Dragomirești. Its length is 19 km (12 mi) and its basin size is 100 km^{2} (39 sq mi). Its main tributaries are the Călimaș and the Idișor.
