= Vadu Izei =

- Commune
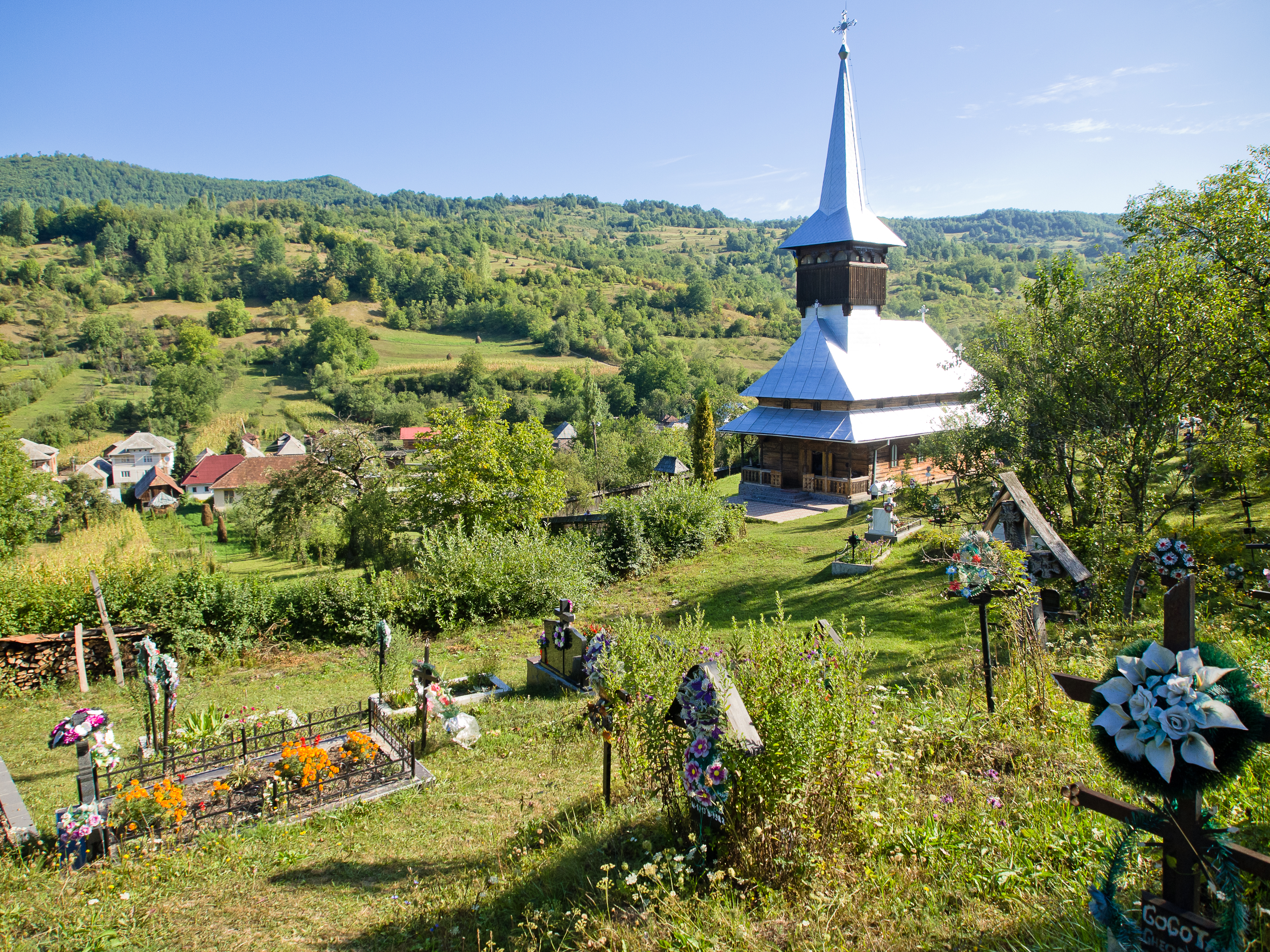
- Wooden church in Valea Stejarului

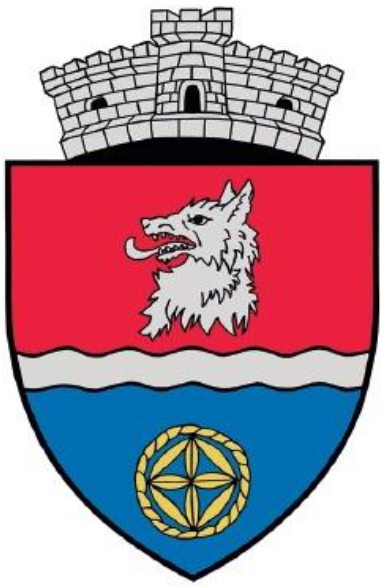
- Coat of arms

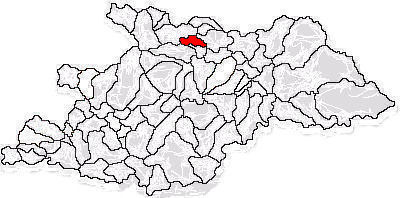
- Location in Maramureș County

- Location in Romania
- Coordinates: 47.8897°N 23.9311°E
- Country: Romania
- County: Maramureș

Government
  - Mayor (2020–2024): Petru Vlașin (PSD)
- Area: 13.47 km^{2} (5.20 sq mi)
- Elevation: 290 m (950 ft)
- Population (2021-12-01): 2,542
  - Density: 188.7/km^{2} (488.8/sq mi)
- Time zone: UTC+02:00 (EET)
  - Summer (DST): UTC+03:00 (EEST)
- Postal code: 437365
- Area code: (+40) 02 62
- Vehicle reg.: MM
- Website: primariavaduizei.ro

Vadu Izei (Hungarian: Farkasrév, Yiddish: וואד, romanized: Wad or Vad) is a commune in Maramureș County, Maramureș, Romania. The commune is composed of two villages, Vadu Izei and Valea Stejarului (until 1960 Valea Porcului; Hungarian: Disznópataka; Yiddish: סאנאפאטאק, romanized: Sanapotek).

The commune lies on the banks of the river Iza. It is located in the northern part of the county, close to the border with Ukraine.

Historical population
Year	Pop.	±%
1880	1,504	—
1900	2,278	+51.5%
1910	2,570	+12.8%
1930	2,693	+4.8%
1956	2,787	+3.5%
1977	3,044	+9.2%
1992	2,927	−3.8%
2002	2,856	−2.4%
2011	2,659	−6.9%
2021	2,542	−4.4%
Source: Census data
