= Șieu, Maramureș =

Șieu
- Commune
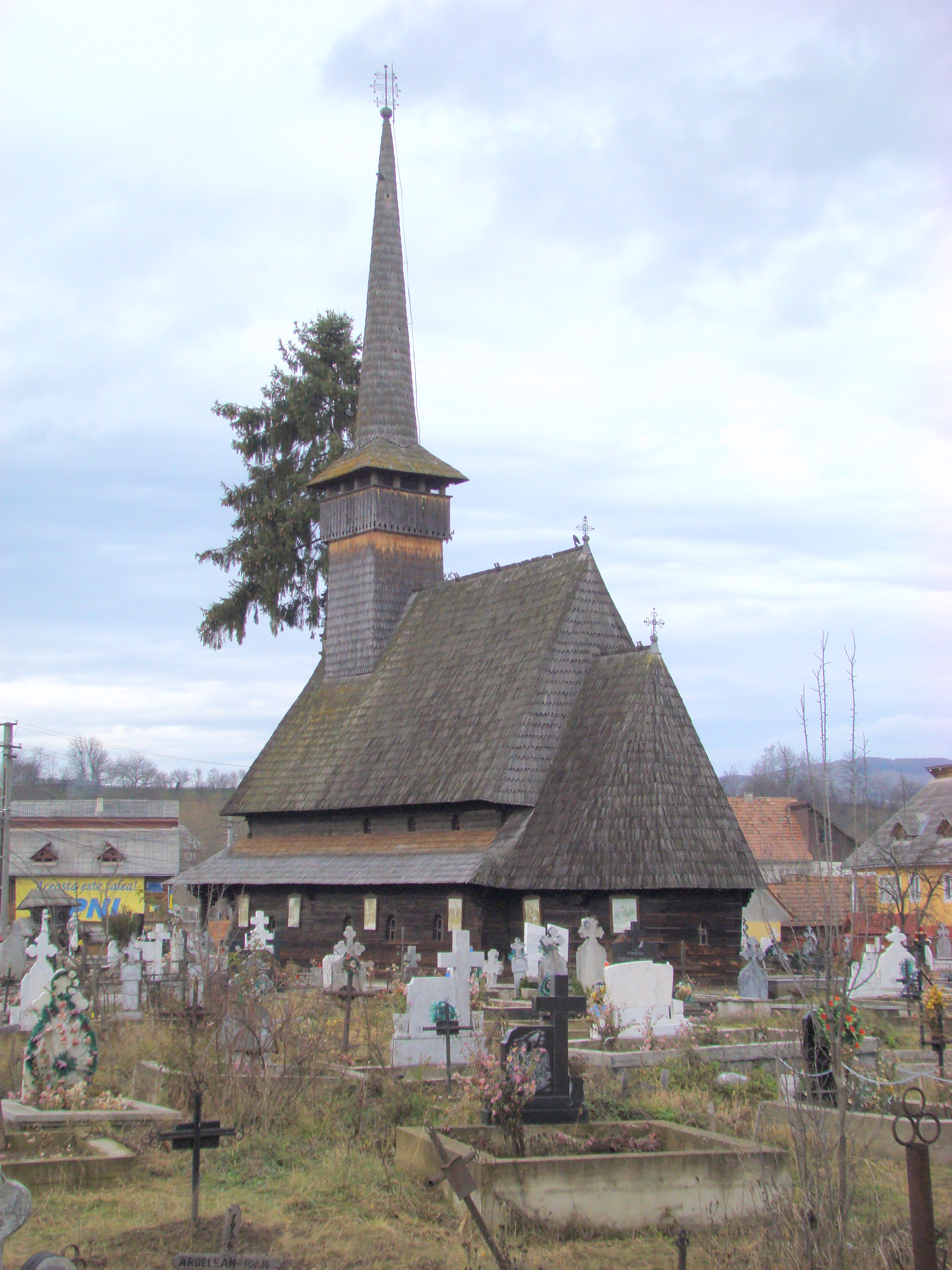
- Church of the Assumption of Virgin Mary in Șieu

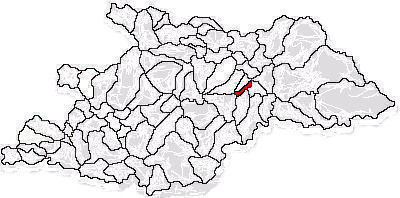
- Location in Maramureș County

- Location in Romania
- Coordinates: 47°43′N 24°13′E
- Country: Romania
- County: Maramureș

Government
  - Mayor (2024–2028): Ioan Ardelean (PNL)
- Area: 8.11 km^{2} (3.13 sq mi)
- Elevation: 376 m (1,234 ft)
- Population (2021-12-01): 2,240
  - Density: 276/km^{2} (715/sq mi)
- Time zone: UTC+02:00 (EET)
  - Summer (DST): UTC+03:00 (EEST)
- Postal code: 437320
- Area code: +(40) 262
- Vehicle reg.: MM

Șieu (Hungarian: Sajó, Yiddish: שיעף, romanized: Sif or Shif) is a commune in Maramureș County, Maramureș, Romania. It is composed of a single village, Șieu.

Historical population
Year	Pop.	±%
1880	1,022	—
1900	1,437	+40.6%
1910	1,771	+23.2%
1930	1,737	−1.9%
1956	2,125	+22.3%
1977	2,399	+12.9%
1992	2,577	+7.4%
2002	2,513	−2.5%
2011	2,348	−6.6%
2021	2,240	−4.6%
Source: Census data

== Natives ==
- Nicolae Dunca (1837 – 1862), military officer
