= Săliștea de Sus =

- Town
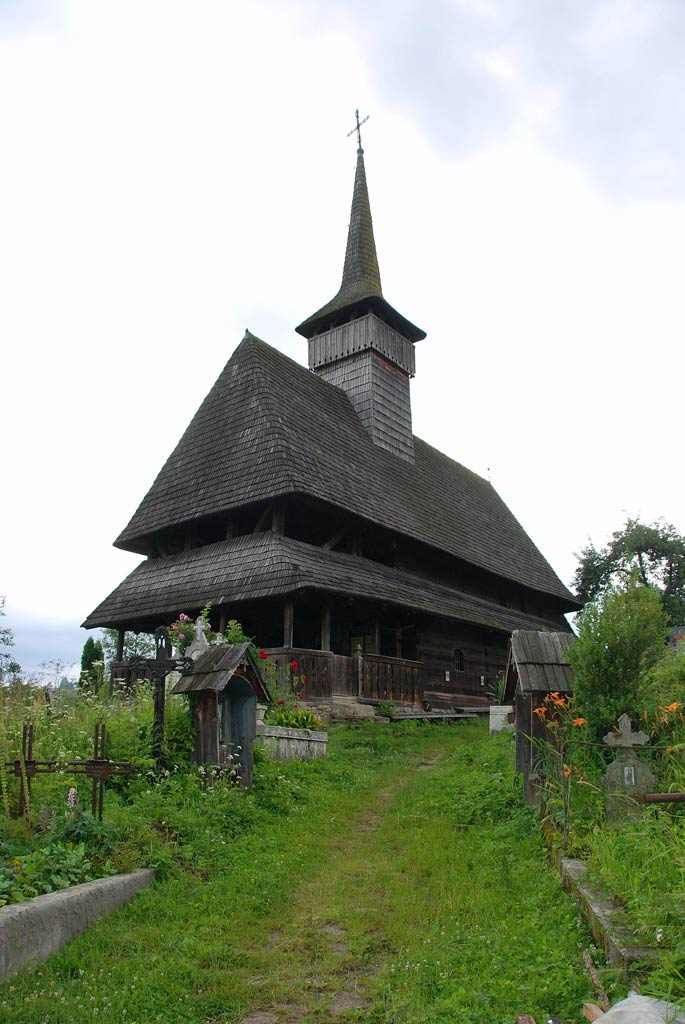
- Nistorești wooden church of Saint Nicholas in Săliștea de Sus

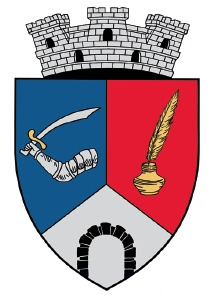
- Coat of arms

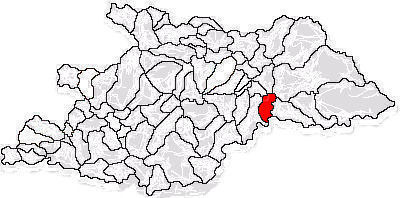
- Location in Maramureș County

- Location in Romania
- Coordinates: 47°39′N 24°21′E
- Country: Romania
- County: Maramureș

Government
  - Mayor (2024–2028): Ștefan Iuga (PSD)
- Area: 64.77 km^{2} (25.01 sq mi)
- Elevation: 500 m (1,600 ft)
- Population (2021-12-01): 4,856
  - Density: 74.97/km^{2} (194.2/sq mi)
- Time zone: UTC+02:00 (EET)
  - Summer (DST): UTC+03:00 (EEST)
- Postal code: 437295
- Area code: (+40) 02 62
- Vehicle reg.: MM
- Website: salisteadesus.ro

Săliștea de Sus (Hungarian: Felsőszelistye, Yiddish: סלישט, romanized: Selist) is a town in Maramureș County, Maramureș, Romania. It was declared a town in 2004.

The town is located in the southeastern part of Maramureș County, about 90 km (56 mi) east of the county seat, Baia Mare, on the border with Bistrița-Năsăud County. It lies at an altitude of 500 m (1,600 ft), in a hilly area in the northeastern foothills of the Țibleș Mountains, on the banks of the Iza River.

Historical population
Year	Pop.	±%
1880	2,166	—
1900	2,793	+28.9%
1910	3,265	+16.9%
1930	3,624	+11.0%
1956	4,841	+33.6%
1977	5,460	+12.8%
1992	5,814	+6.5%
2002	5,196	−10.6%
2011	4,893	−5.8%
2021	4,856	−0.8%
Source: Census data

At the 2021 census, Săliștea de Sus had a population of 4,856, with an absolute majority (97%) of ethnic Romanians.
