= Țibleș Mountains =

Mountain range in Romania

Coordinates: 47.520°N 24.259°E

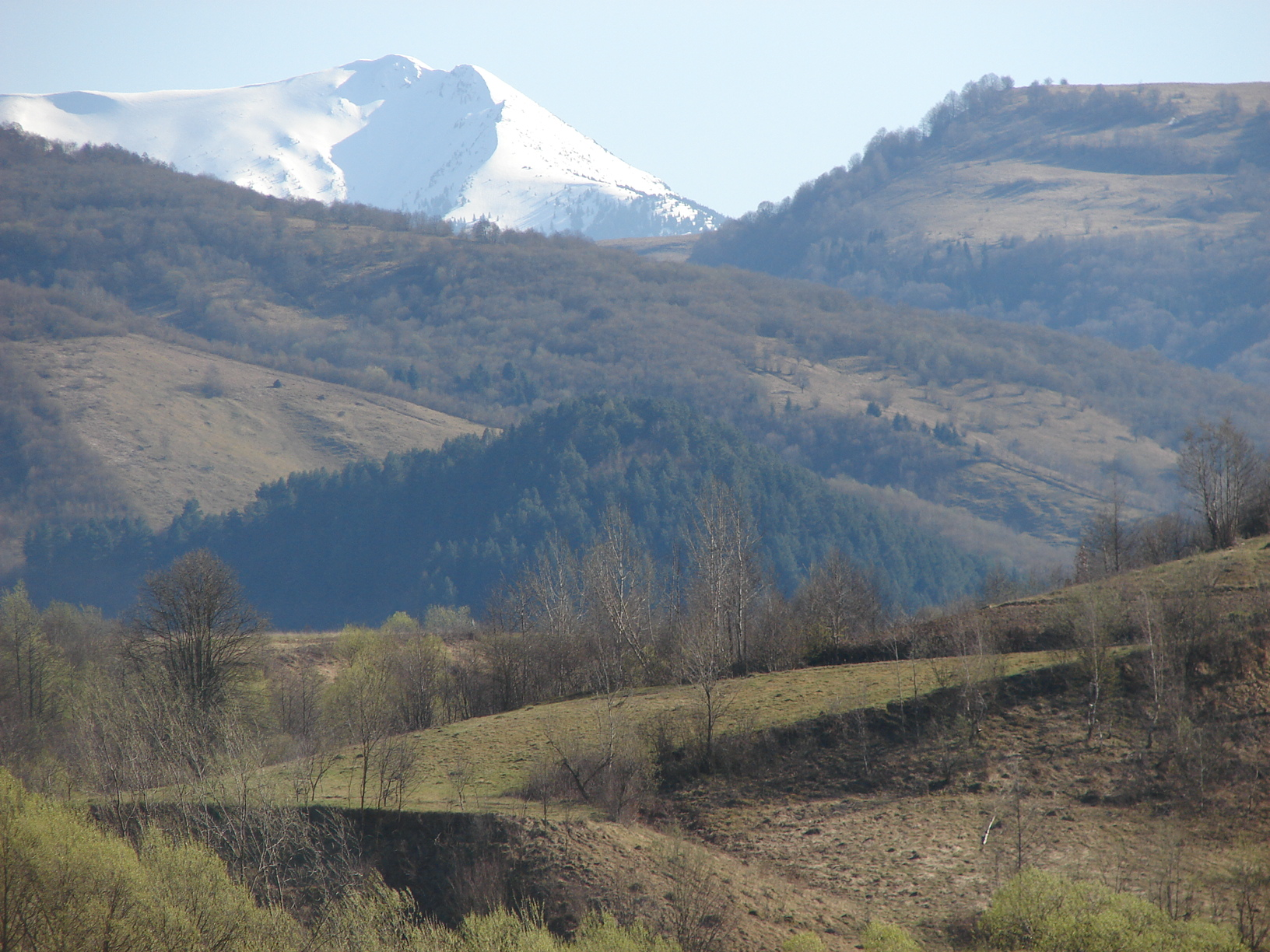
Țibleș Mountains, viewed from Dragomirești

The Țibleș Mountains (Romanian: Munții Țibleș, Hungarian: Cibles or Széples) are a volcanic mountain range located in Maramureș County, in northern Romania. They belong to the Vihorlat-Gutin Area of the Inner Eastern Carpathians.

They are located at the southern border of historical Maramureș region and they cut off the Maramureș valleys from the rest of Romania. The range's highest peak is Bran Peak, at 1,840 m (6,040 ft). The closest town is Dragomirești.

== See also ==
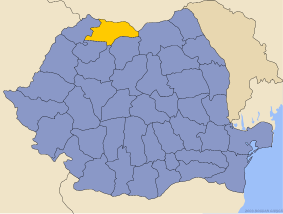
Maramureș County in Romania

- Romanian Carpathians

== Sources ==
- Földvary, Gábor Z. (1988). Geology of the Carpathian Region. Singapore: World Scientific Publishing Company. ISBN 9789813103825.
