= Maramureș County =

County of Romania

Coordinates: 47°40′22″N 24°00′18″E

Maramureș County Județul Maramureș
- County
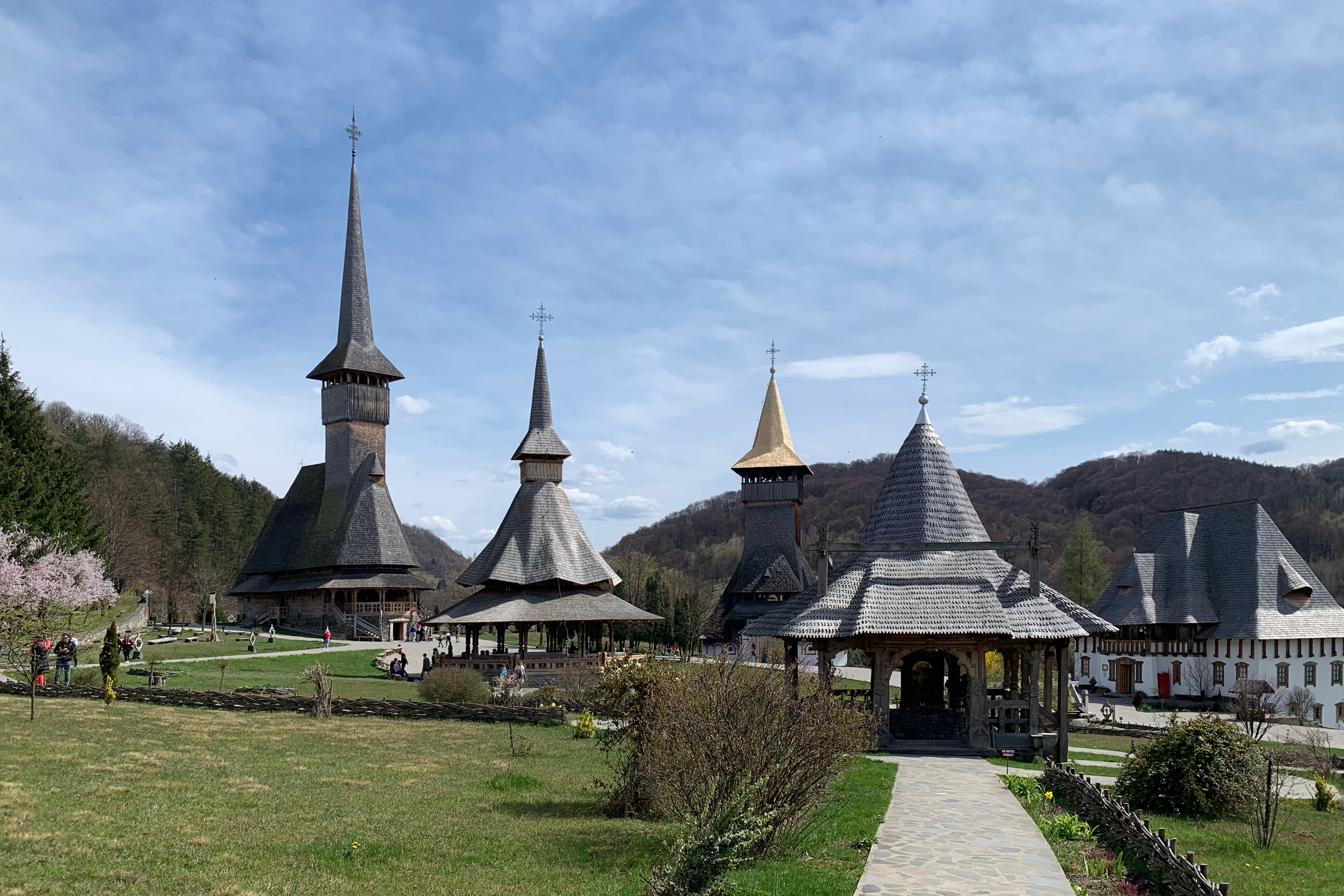
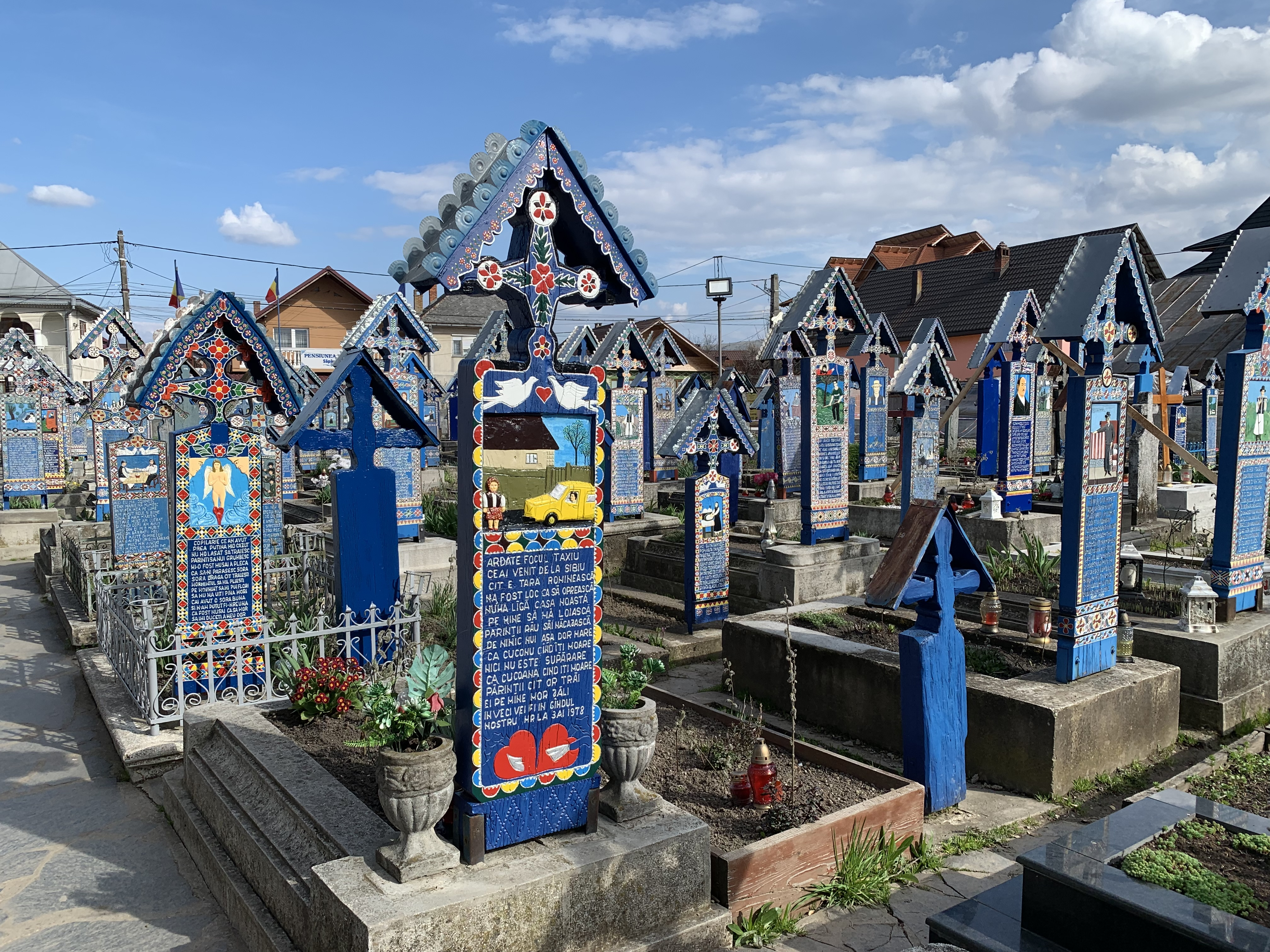
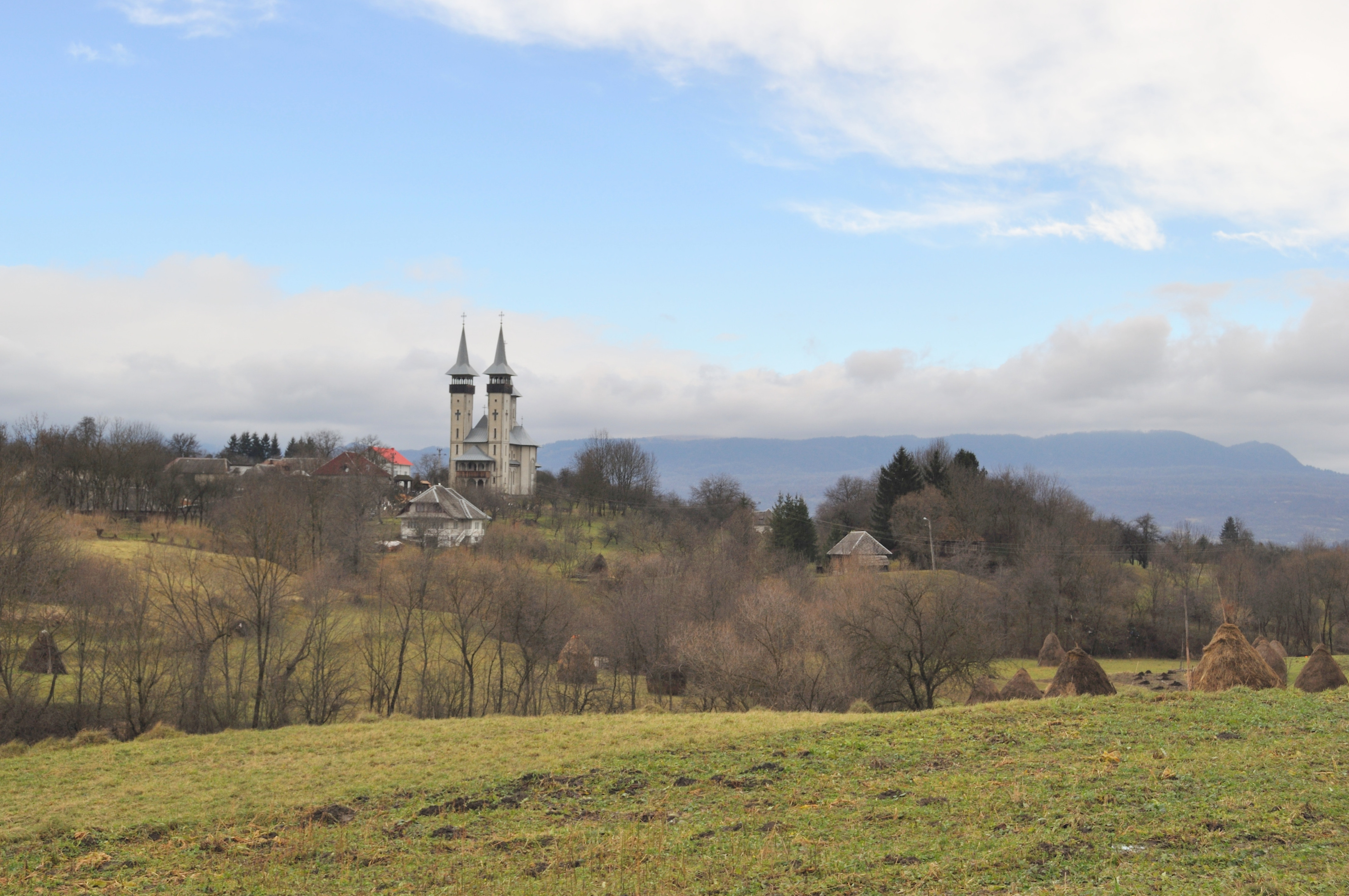
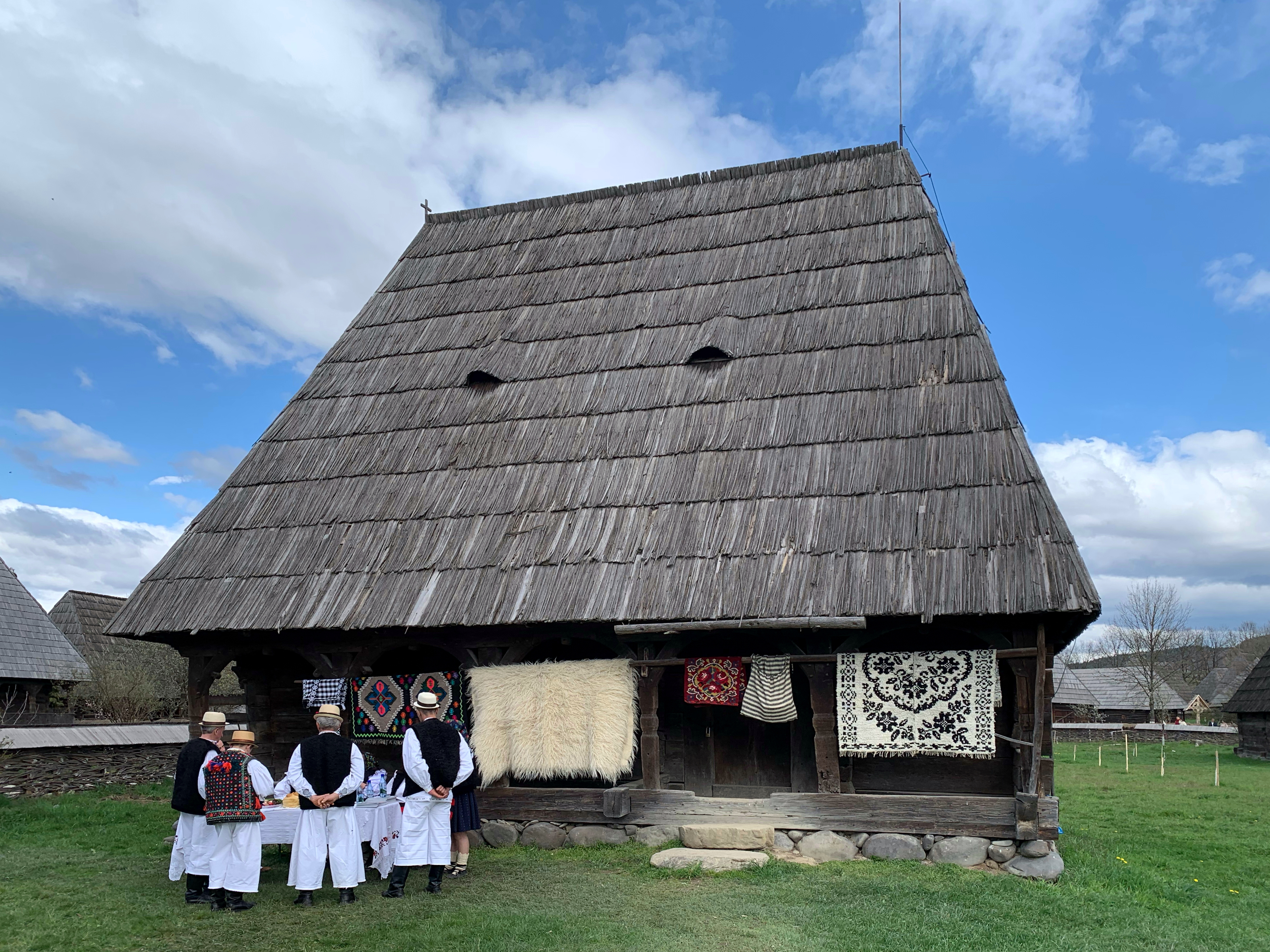
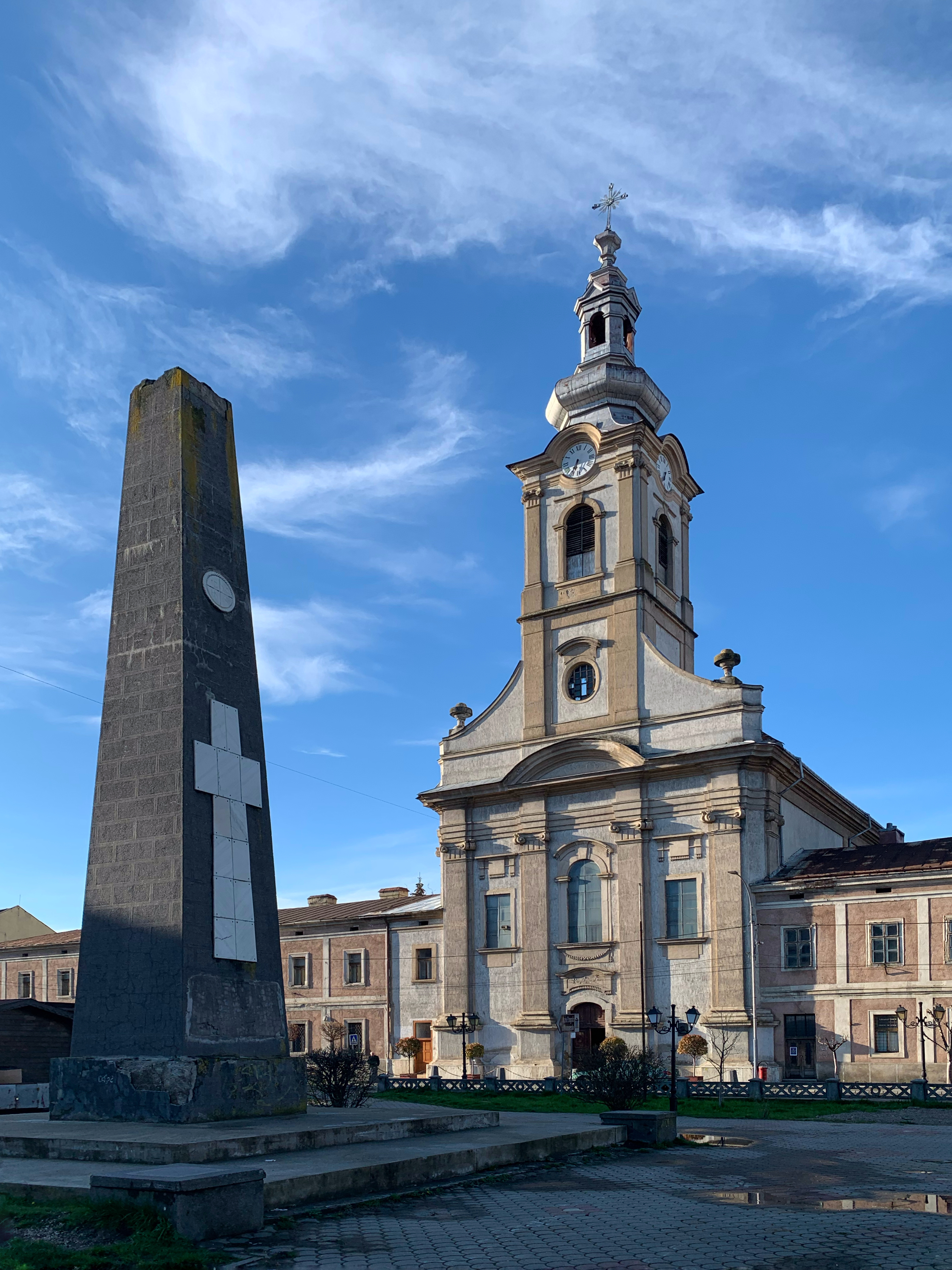
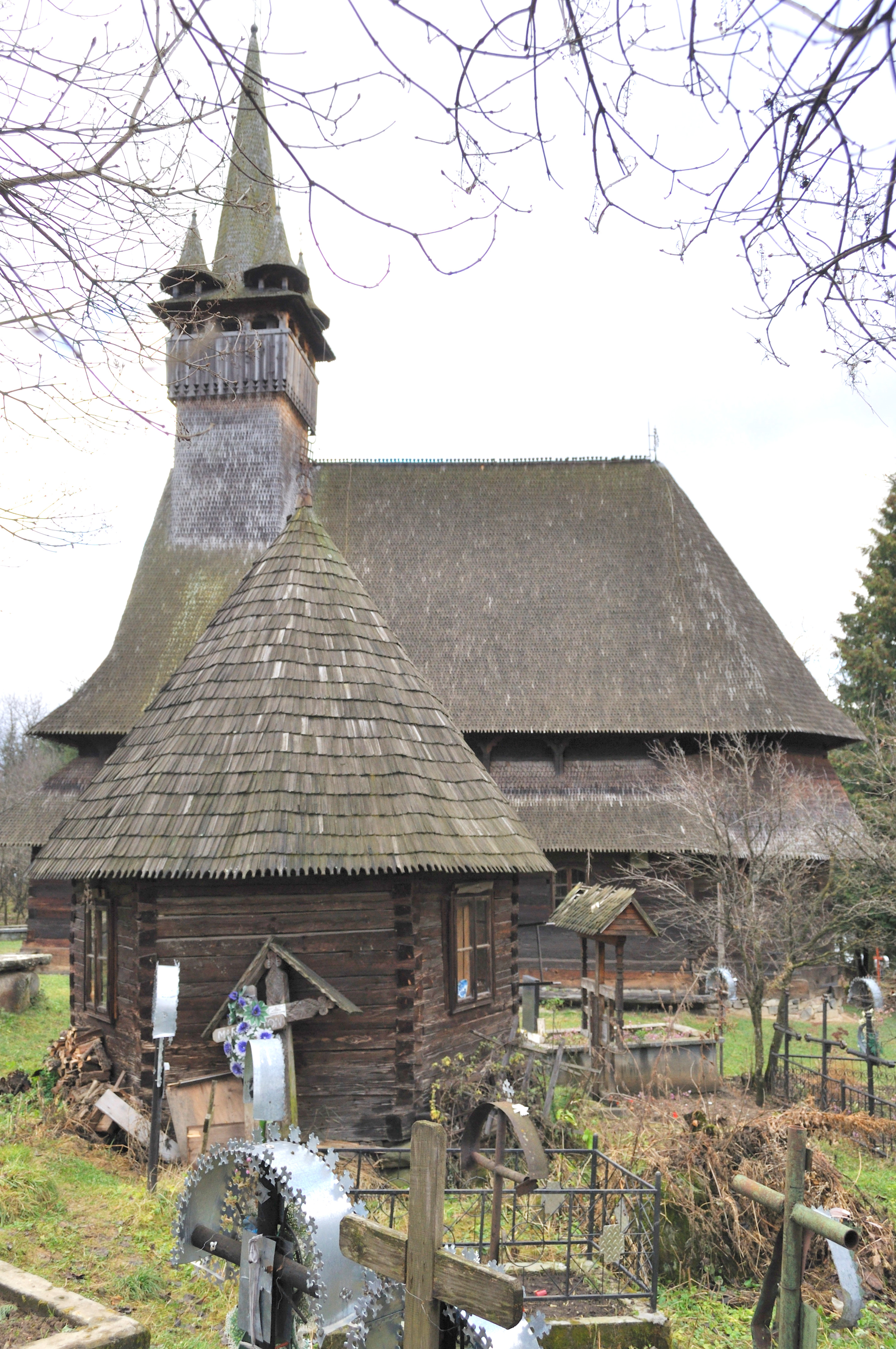
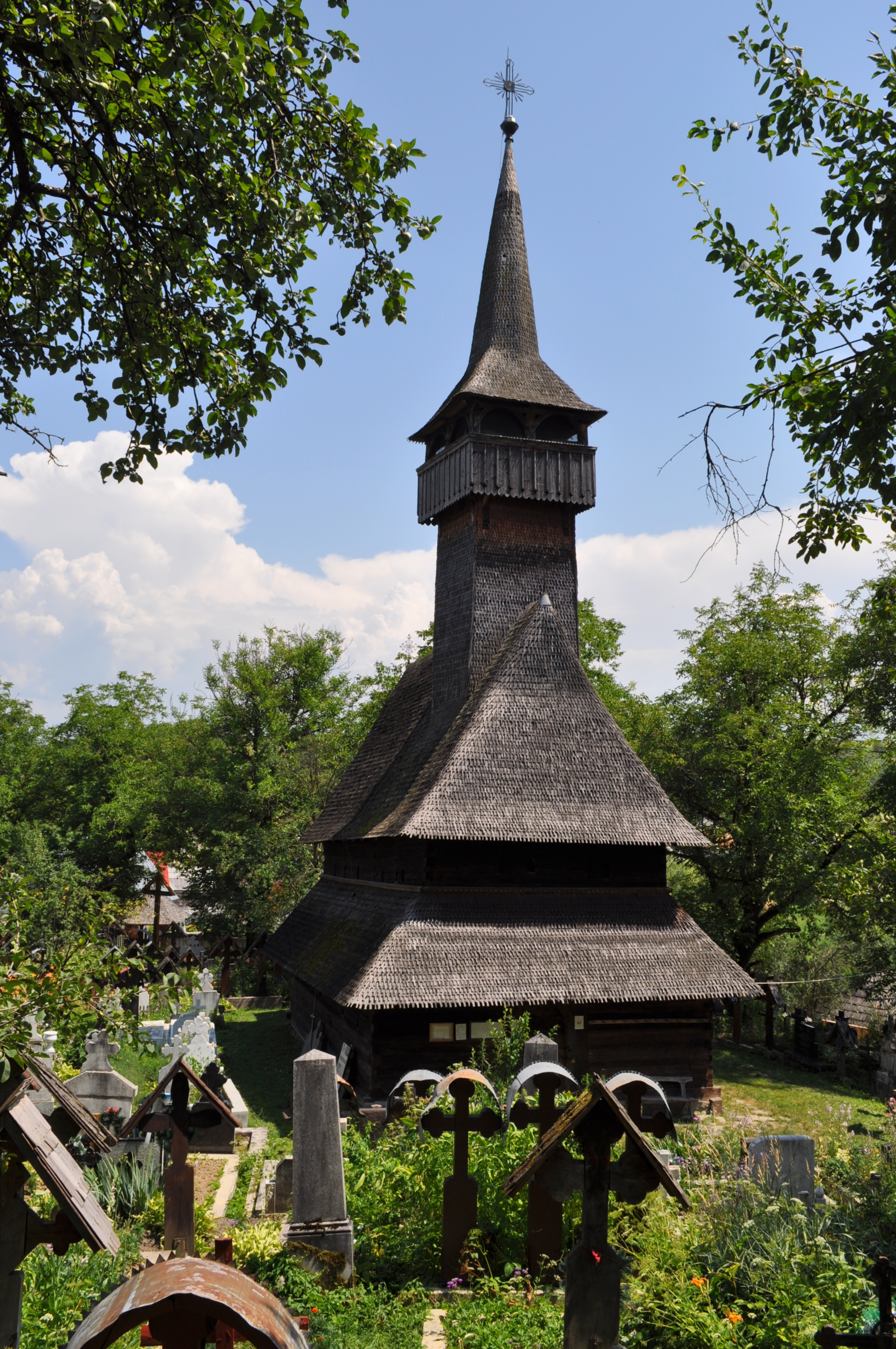
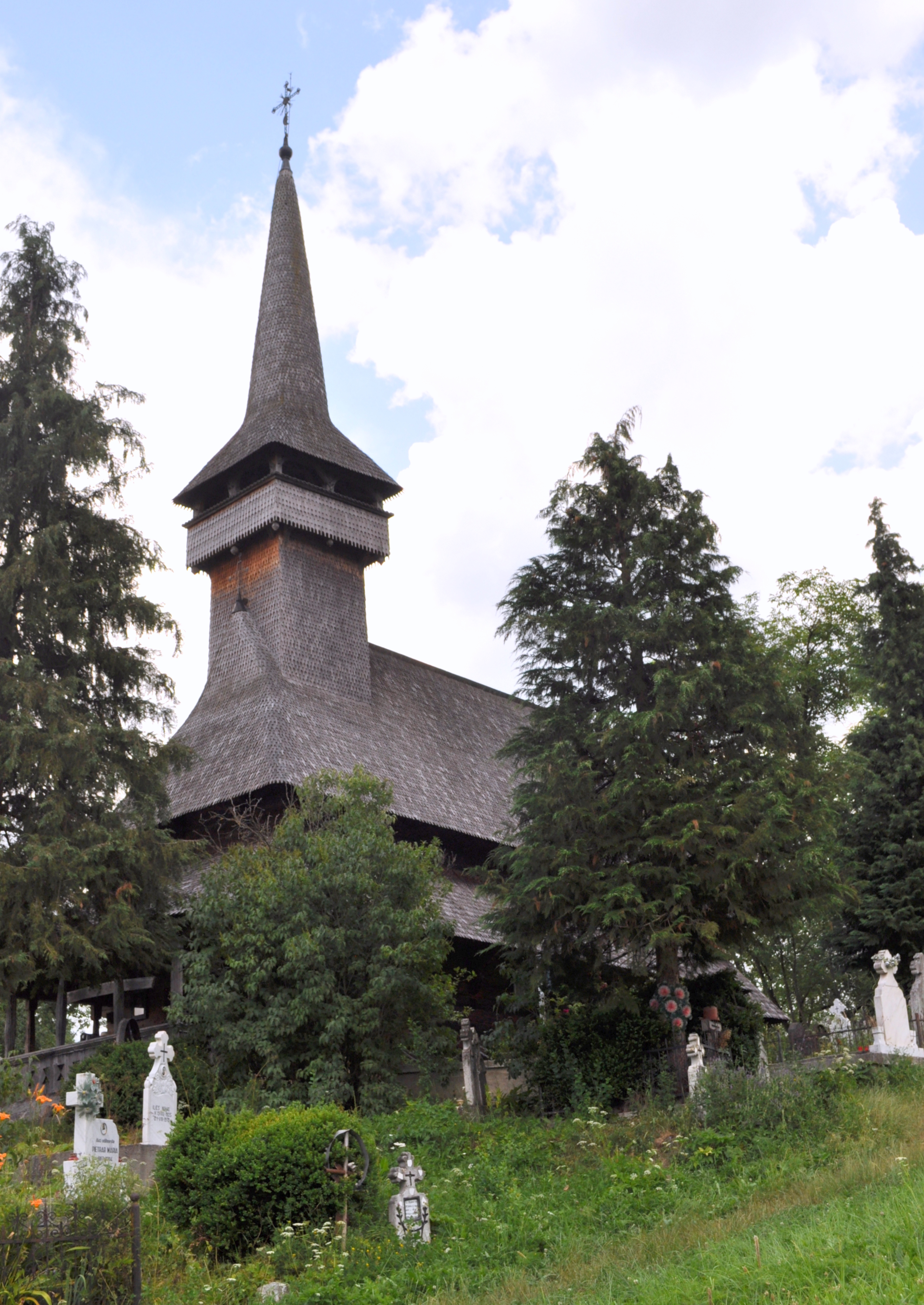
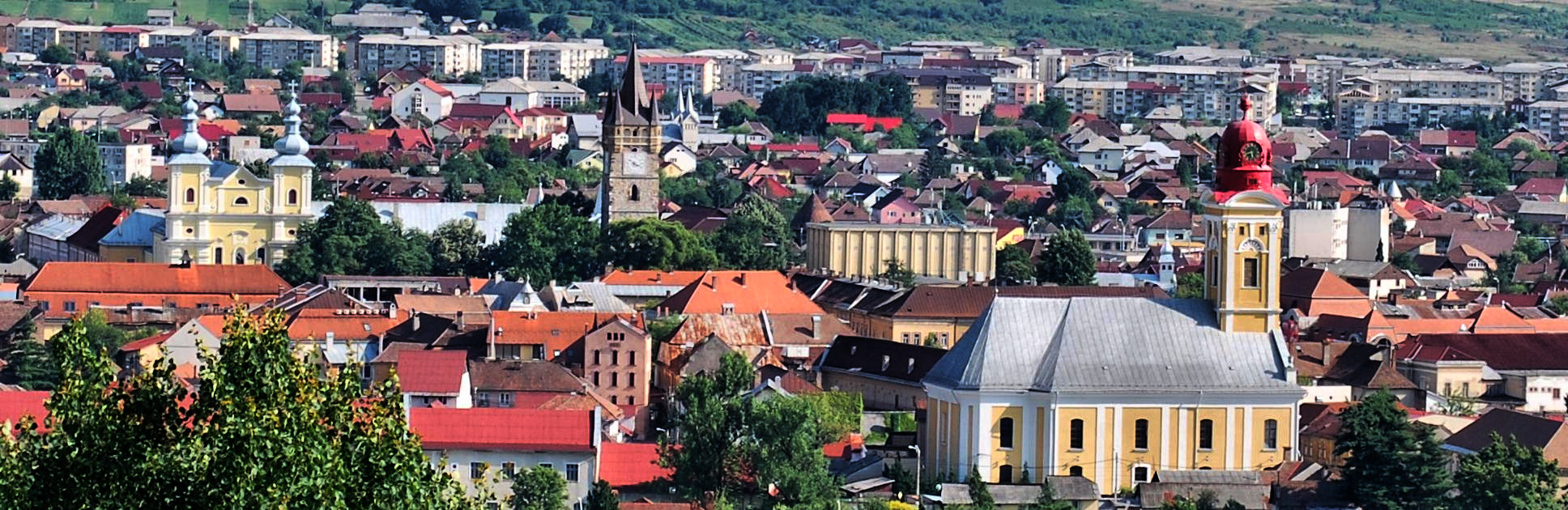
- (From top to bottom and left to right) Bârsana Monastery, Merry Cemetery, Breb, Maramureș Village Museum, city centre of Sighetu Marmației, Wooden Church of Budești Josani, Wooden Church of Ieud Deal, Wooden Church of Poienile Izei, city centre of Baia Mare

- Flag Coat of arms

- Country: Romania
- Development region: Nord-Vest
- Historical region: Maramureș
- Capital: Baia Mare

Government
  - President of the County Board: Ionel Bogdan Ovidiu (EPP)
  - Prefect: Rudolf Stauder

Area
  - Total: 6,304 km^{2} (2,434 sq mi)
  - Rank: 15th

Population (2021-12-01)
  - Total: 452,475
  - Rank: 17th
  - Density: 71.78/km^{2} (185.9/sq mi)
- Telephone code: (+40) 262 or (+40) 362
- ISO 3166 code: RO-MM
- GDP (nominal): US$ 6.890 billion (2025)
- GDP per capita: US$ 15,227 (2025)
- Website: County Council; Prefecture

Maramureș County (Romanian pronunciation: [maraˈmureʃ]) is a county (județ) in Romania, in the Southern Maramureș region. The county seat is Baia Mare.

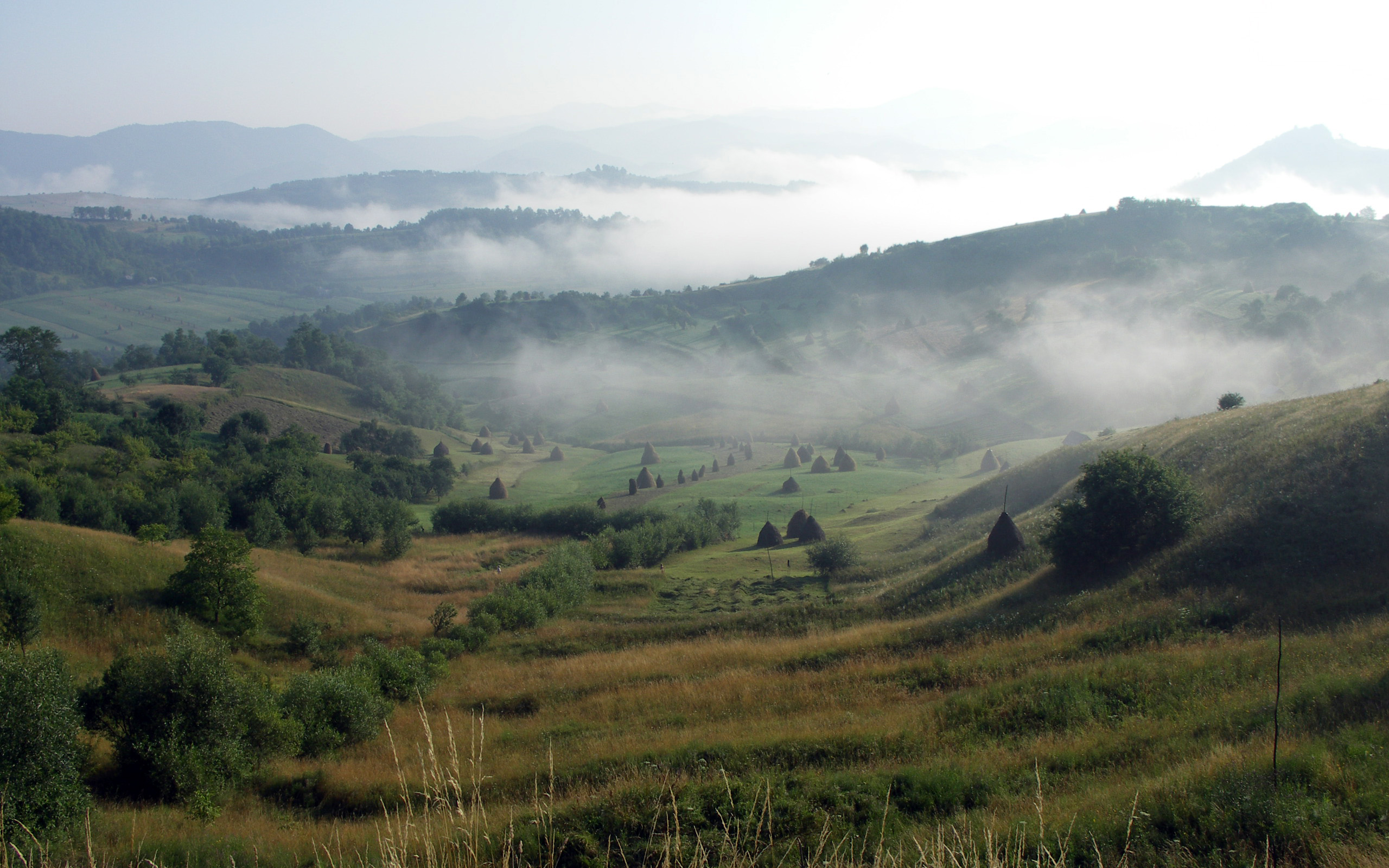
Văleni, overlooking Valea Izei

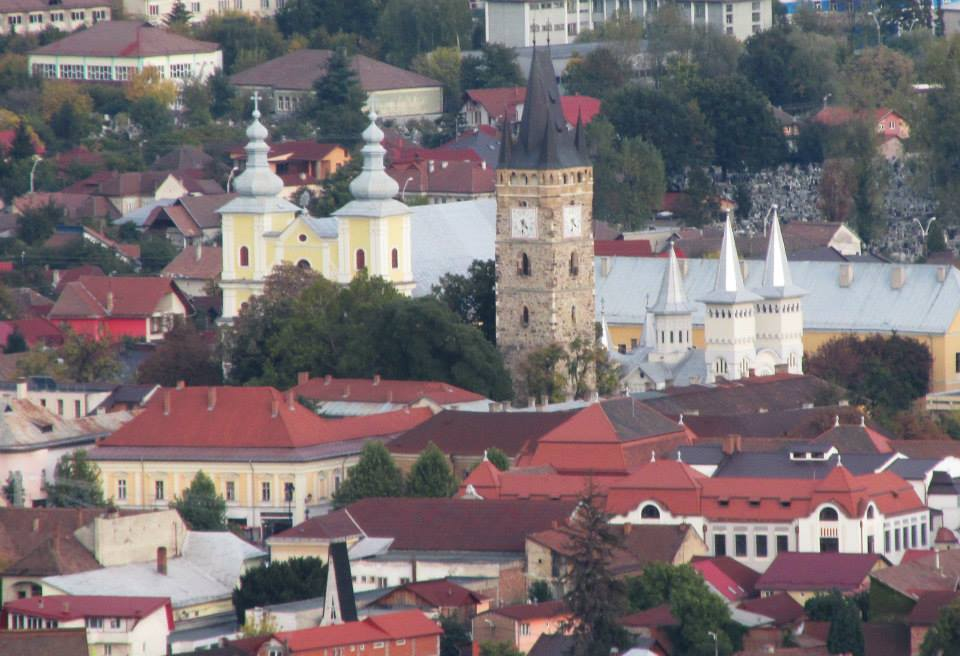
The old city centre of Baia Mare, the largest city and the county seat.

== Name ==
In Hungarian it is known as Máramaros megye, in Ukrainian as Мараморо́щина, in German as Kreis Marmarosch, in Rusyn as Мараморош, and in Yiddish as מאַרמאַראָש.

== Geography ==

Maramureș County is situated in the northern part of Romania, in the historical region of Transylvania, and has a border with Ukraine. This county has a total area of 6,304 square kilometres (2,434 sq mi), of which 43% is covered by the Rodna Mountains, with its tallest peak, Pietrosul, at 2,303 metres (7,556 ft) altitude.

Together with the Gutâi and Țibleș mountain ranges, the Rodna mountains are part of the Eastern Carpathians. The rest of the county are hills, plateaus, and valleys. The county is crossed by Tisa River and its main tributaries: the Iza, Vișeu, and Mara rivers.

=== Neighbours ===
The neighbouring territorial units, both Romanian and foreign, to Maramureș County are listed below:

- Suceava County to the east;
- Satu Mare County to the west;
- Ukraine to the north – Ivano-Frankivsk Oblast, Chernivtsi Oblast and Zakarpattia Oblast;
- Sălaj County, Cluj County, and Bistrița-Năsăud County to the south.

== Administrative divisions ==
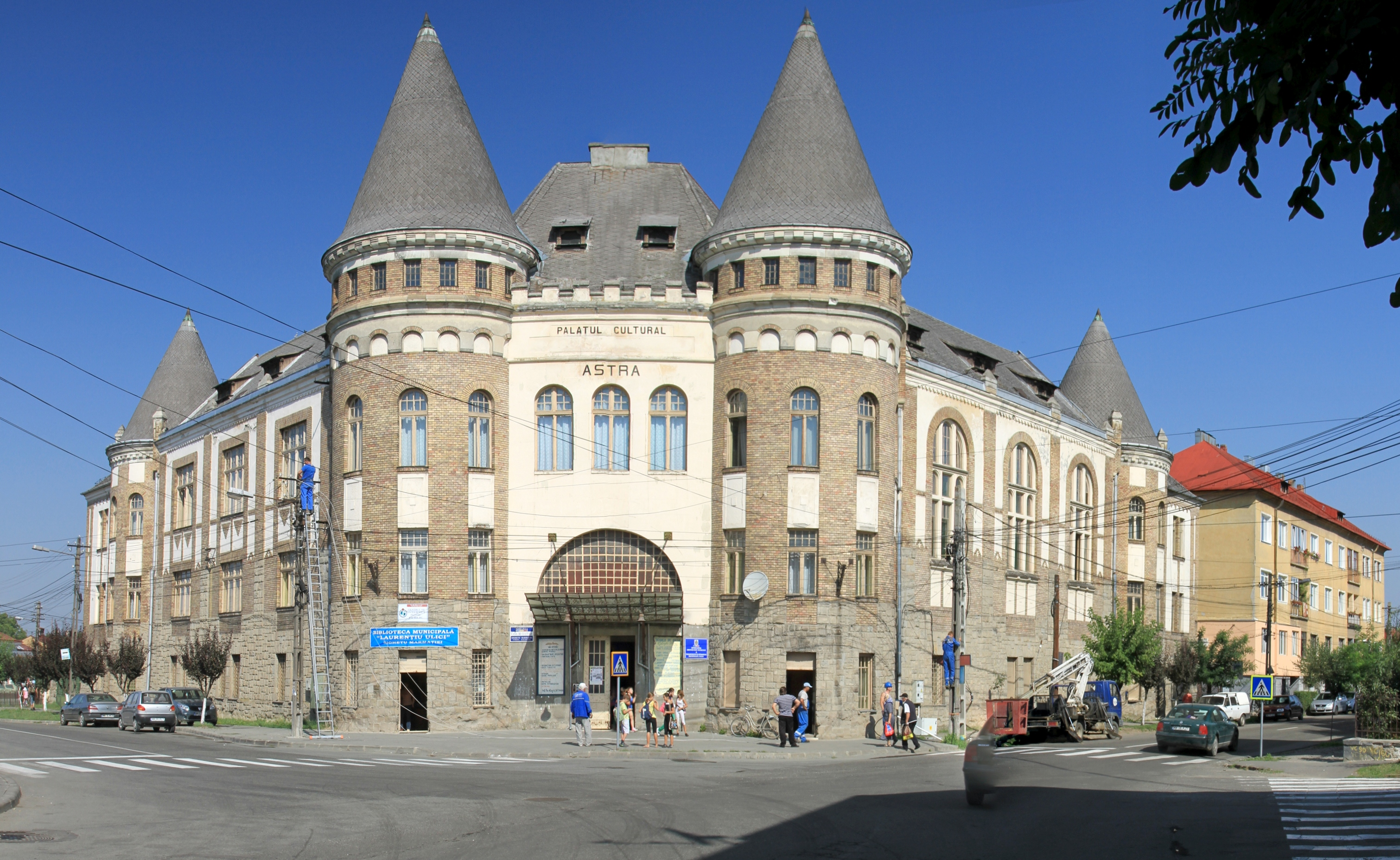
Sighetu Marmației

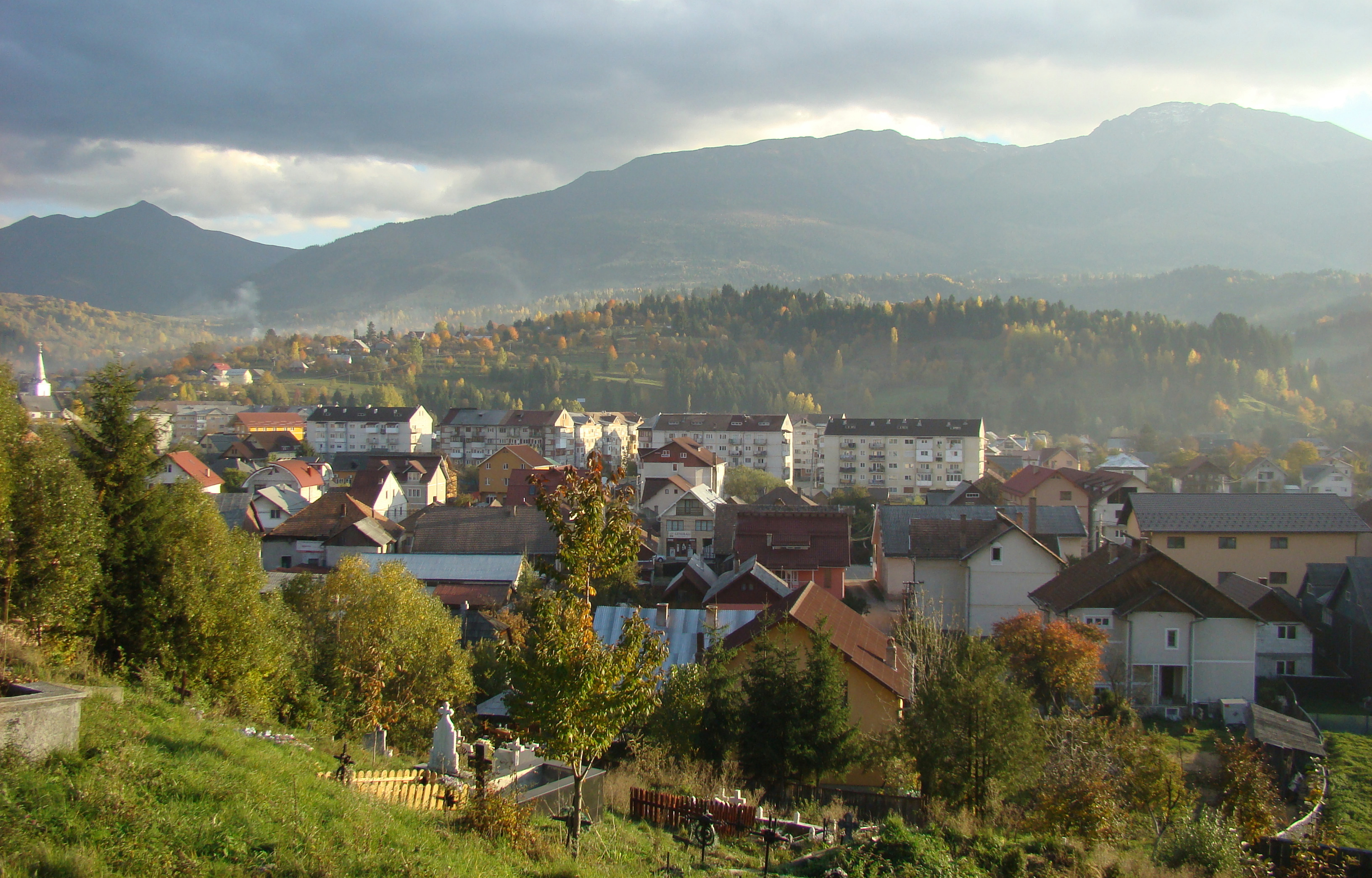
Borșa

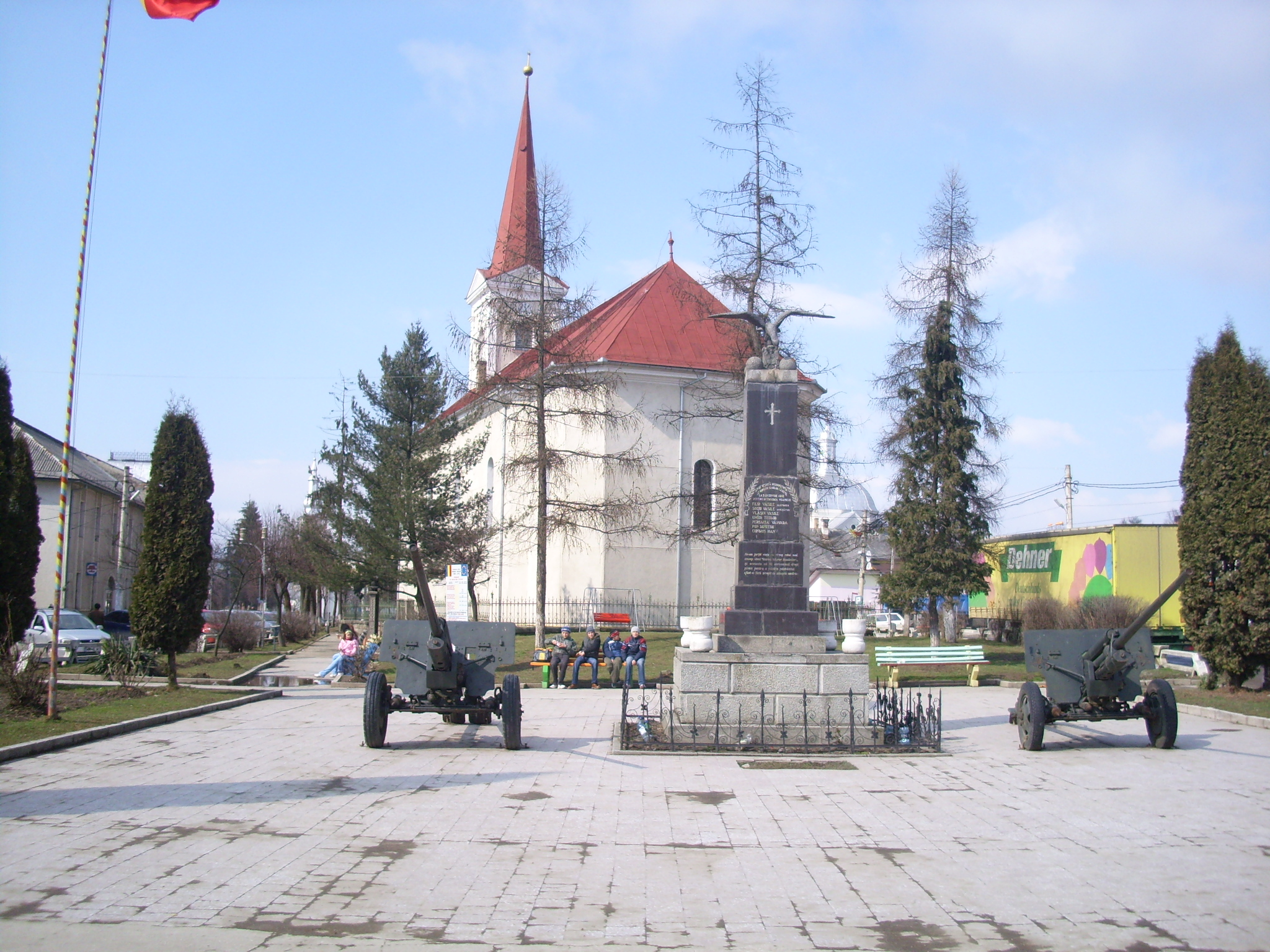
Târgu Lăpuș

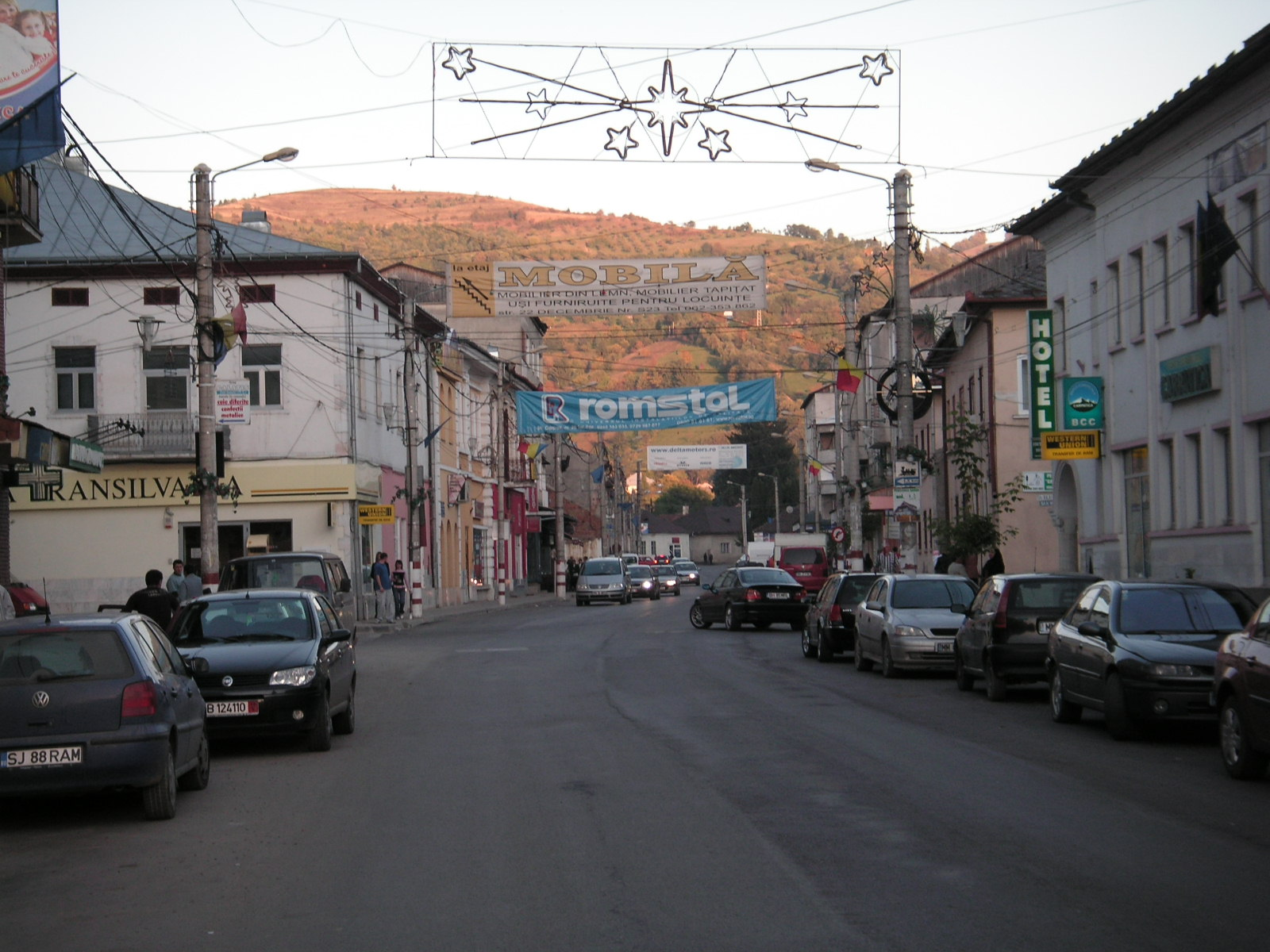
Vișeu de Sus

Maramureș County has 2 municipalities, 11 towns and 63 communes.

- Municipalities
  - Baia Mare - county seat; population: 114,925 (as of 2011)
  - Sighetu Marmației
- Towns
  - Baia Sprie
  - Borșa
  - Cavnic
  - Dragomirești
  - Săliștea de Sus
  - Seini
  - Șomcuta Mare
  - Târgu Lăpuș
  - Tăuții-Măgherăuș
  - Ulmeni
  - Vișeu de Sus
- Communes
  - Ardusat
  - Ariniș
  - Asuaju de Sus
  - Băița de sub Codru
  - Băiuț
  - Bârsana
  - Băsești
  - Bicaz
  - Bistra
  - Bocicoiu Mare
  - Bogdan Vodă
  - Boiu Mare
  - Botiza
  - Breb
  - Budești
  - Călinești
  - Câmpulung la Tisa
  - Cernești
  - Cicârlău
  - Coaș
  - Coltău
  - Copalnic-Mănăștur
  - Coroieni
  - Cupșeni
  - Desești
  - Dumbrăvița
  - Fărcașa
  - Gârdani
  - Giulești
  - Groși
  - Groșii Țibleșului
  - Ieud
  - Lăpuș
  - Leordina
  - Mireșu Mare
  - Moisei
  - Oarța de Jos
  - Ocna Șugatag
  - Onceşti
  - Petrova
  - Poienile de sub Munte
  - Poienile Izei
  - Recea
  - Remetea Chioarului
  - Remeți
  - Repedea
  - Rona de Jos
  - Rona de Sus
  - Rozavlea
  - Ruscova
  - Săcălășeni
  - Săcel
  - Sălsig
  - Săpânța
  - Sarasău
  - Satulung
  - Șieu
  - Șișești
  - Strâmtura
  - Suciu de Sus
  - Vadu Izei
  - Valea Chioarului
  - Vima Mică
  - Vișeu de Jos

== Economy ==
Maramureș is known for its pastoral and agricultural traditions, largely unscathed by the industrialisation campaign carried out during Romania's communist period. Ploughing, planting, harvesting, and hay making and handling are mostly done through manual labour. The county is also home to a strong mining industry of extraction of metals other than iron. The industrial plants built around Baia Mare during the communist period heavily polluted the area in the past, but recently, due to the decline of the city's industrial activity, the area has become less polluted.

== Tourism ==
Typical Wooden Church in Maramureș

The region is known for its beautiful rural scenery, local small woodwork and craftwork industry as well as for its churches and original rural architecture. There are not many paved roads in the rural areas, but most of them are usually accessible.

The county's main tourist attractions are:

- The cities of Baia Mare and Sighetu Marmației.
- The villages on the Iza, Mara, and Vișeu Valleys.
  - The Wooden churches of Maramureș
  - The wooden churches of Lăpuș Country
  - The wooden churches of Chioar Country
  - The Merry Cemetery of Săpânța
- The Rodna Mountains, the Rodna Mountains National Park, and the Maramureș Mountains Natural Park.
- The landscape of Cavnic.
- The Memorial of the Victims of Communism and of the Resistance in Sighetu Marmației.

== Demographics ==
Ethnic composition of Maramureș County (2021)
1. Romanians (84.7%)
2. Ukrainians (including Hutsuls and other Rusyns) (6.36%)
3. Hungarians (5.73%)
4. Romani (2.94%)
5. Germans (Zipser Germans and Transylvanian Saxons) (0.14%)
6. Others (0.19%)

According to the 2021 census, the county had a population of 452,475 and the population density was 71.8/km^{2} (185.9/sq mi).

Year	County population
1948	321,287
1956	367,114 ▲
1966	427,645 ▲
1977	492,860 ▲
1992	538,534 ▲
2002	510,110 ▼
2011	461,290 ▼
2021	452,475 ▼

== Politics ==
The Maramureș County Council, elected at the 2020 local elections, consists of 34 councillors, with the following party composition:

Party	Seats	Current County Council
National Liberal Party (PNL)	13	
Coalition for Maramureș (PSD)	10	
People's Movement Party (PMP)	5	
PRO Romania (PRO)	3	
Save Romania Union (USR)	3	

== Historical county ==
Județul Maramureș
- County (Județ)
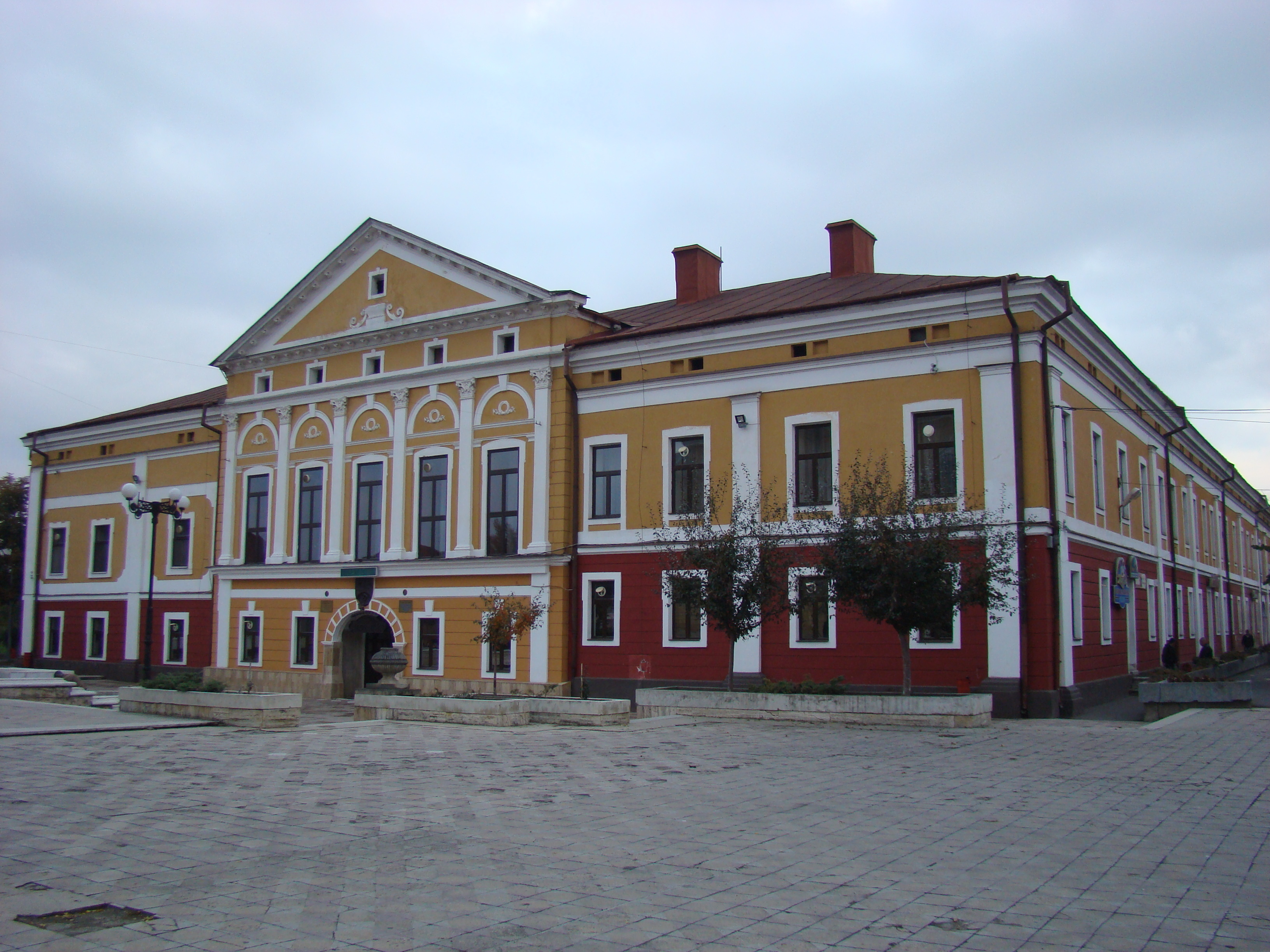
- The Maramureș County Prefect's building from the interwar period.

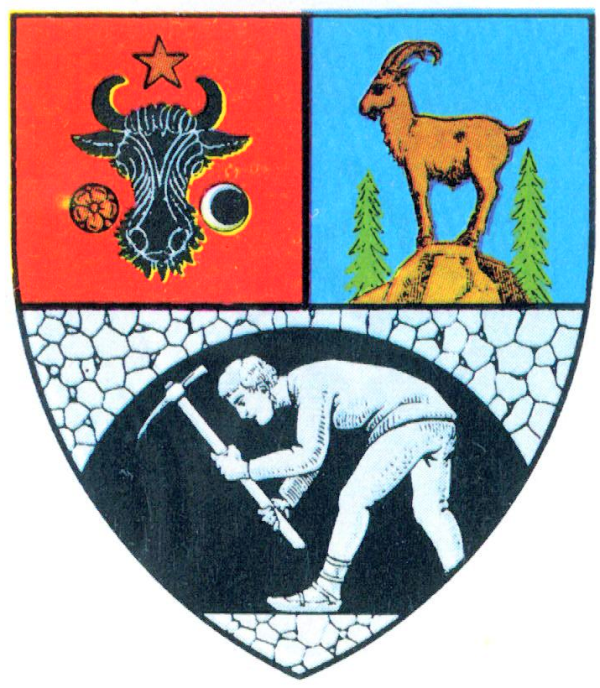
- Coat of arms

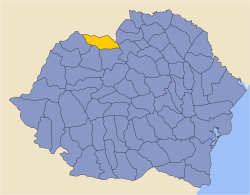
- Country: Romania
- Historic region: Maramureș
- Capital city (Reședință de județ): Sighet

Area
  - Total: 3,381 km^{2} (1,305 sq mi)

Population (1930)
  - Total: 194,619
  - Density: 57.56/km^{2} (149.1/sq mi)
- Time zone: UTC+2 (EET)
  - Summer (DST): UTC+3 (EEST)

=== History ===
- The territory was part of the Kingdom of Hungary from the 11th century and was nominally divided between the Gyepű border region.
- In 1199, the region is first attested.
- In 1241 the Tatar invasion decimated about half of the local population.
- In the 14th century, Duke (knyaz) Bogdan of Maramureș crossed the Carpathians and founded the Principality of Moldavia. In 1343, the Voivodeship of Maramureș, led by a Romanian nobility, is established, and it lasts until 1402.
- In the Middle Ages, the historical region of Máramaros county (Maramureș) was known for its salt mines and later for its lumber.

In 1920, under the Treaty of Trianon, the northern part of the county became part of newly-formed Czechoslovakia, while the southern part (including Sighetu Marmației) became part of the Kingdom of Romania.

After the administrative unification law in 1925, the county remained as it was, with an identical name and territory.

In 1938, King Carol II promulgated a new Constitution, and subsequently he had the administrative division of the Romanian territory changed. Ten ținuturi (approximate translation: "lands") were created (by merging the counties) to be ruled by rezidenți regali (approximate translation: "Royal Residents") – appointed directly by the king – instead of the prefects. Maramureș County became part of Ținutul Crișuri.

In August 1940, under the auspices of Nazi Germany, which imposed the Second Vienna Award, the county was transferred back to Hungary with the rest of Northern Transylvania. In October 1944, Romanian forces with Soviet assistance recaptured the ceded territory and reintegrated it into Romania, re-establishing the county. Romanian jurisdiction over the county per the Treaty of Trianon was reaffirmed in the Paris Peace Treaties, 1947. The counties of Romania, including Maramureș, were disestablished by the communist government of Romania in 1950 in favour of regions, and re-established in 1968 when Romania restored the county administrative system.

=== Administration ===
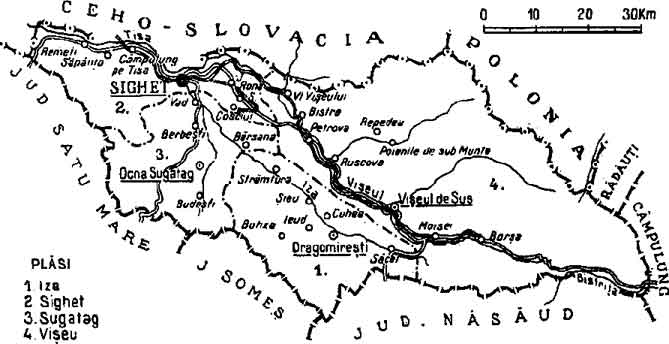
Map of Maramureș County as constituted in 1938.

In 1930, the county was originally divided into three districts (plăși):

1. Plasa Iza
2. Plasa Sighet (headquartered at Sighet)
3. Plasa Vișeu (headquartered at Vișeu de Sus)

Subsequently, the Iza and Sighet districts were reorganized into three districts, adding one:

4. Plasa Șugatag (headquartered at Ocna Șugatag)

=== Population ===
According to the 1930 census, the county's population was 194,619, 57.9% Romanian, 20.9% Jews, 11.9% Ruthenians (including Ukrainians), 6.9% Hungarians, 2.0% Germans, as well as other minorities. The following composition was recorded from the religious point of view: 64.4% Greek Catholic, 21.0% Jewish, 6.4% Roman Catholic, 5.3% Eastern Orthodox, 1.8% Reformed, as well as other minorities.

==== Urban population ====
In 1930 the county's urban population ethnically consisted of 38.6% Jews, 35.4% Romanians, 19.9% Hungarians, 4.5% Ruthenians (including Ukrainians), as well as other minorities. Yiddish was spoken by 36.6% of the urban population, followed by Romanian (33.7%), Hungarian (25.7%), Ukrainian (2.3%), as well as other minorities. From the religious point of view, the urban inhabitants were Jewish (38.9%), Greek Catholics (38.0%), Roman Catholics (12.8%), Reformed (5.7%), Eastern Orthodox (3.5%), as well as other minorities.

== People ==
Natives of the county include:

- Augustin Buzura
- Ștefan Hrușcă
- Gheorghe Pop de Băsești
- Paula Seling
- Elie Wiesel
