= Small-angle scattering =

Analyzing a sample by studying trajectories of radiation passing through it

Small-angle scattering (SAS) is a scattering technique based on deflection of collimated radiation away from the straight trajectory after it interacts with structures that are much larger than the wavelength of the radiation. The deflection is small (0.1-10°) hence the name small-angle. SAS techniques can give information about the size, shape and orientation of structures in a sample.

SAS is a powerful technique for investigating large-scale structures from 10 Å up to thousands and even several tens of thousands of angstroms. The most important feature of the SAS method is its potential for analyzing the inner structure of disordered systems, and frequently the application of this method is a unique way to obtain direct structural information on systems with random arrangement of density inhomogeneities in such large-scales.

Currently, the SAS technique, with its well-developed experimental and theoretical procedures and wide range of studied objects, is a self-contained branch of the structural analysis of matter. SAS can refer to small angle neutron scattering (SANS), small angle X-ray scattering (SAXS) or small angle light scattering (SALS).

== Applications ==
Small-angle scattering is particularly useful because of the dramatic increase in forward scattering that occurs at phase transitions, known as critical opalescence, and because many materials, substances and biological systems possess interesting and complex features in their structure, which match the useful length scale ranges that these techniques probe. The technique provides valuable information over a wide variety of scientific and technological applications including chemical aggregation, defects in materials, surfactants, colloids, ferromagnetic correlations in magnetism, alloy segregation, polymers, proteins, biological membranes, viruses, ribosome and macromolecules. While analysis of the data can give information on size, shape, etc., without making any model assumptions a preliminary analysis of the data can only give information on the radius of gyration for a particle using Guinier's equation.

== Theory ==
=== Continuum description ===
SAS patterns are typically represented as scattered intensity as a function of the magnitude of the scattering vector $q = 4\pi \sin (\theta ) / \lambda$. Here $2\theta$ is the angle between the incident beam and the detector measuring the scattered intensity, and $\lambda$ is the wavelength of the radiation. One interpretation of the scattering vector is that it is the resolution or yardstick with which the sample is observed. In the case of a two-phase sample, e.g. small particles in liquid suspension, the only contrast leading to scattering in the typical range of resolution of the SAS is simply Δρ, the difference in average scattering length density between the particle and the surrounding liquid, because variations in ρ due to the atomic structure only become visible at higher angles. This means that the total integrated intensity of the SAS pattern (in 3D) is an invariant quantity proportional to the square Δρ^{2}. In 1-dimensional projection, as usually recorded for an isotropic pattern this invariant quantity becomes $\int I(q)q^2\,dx$, where the integral runs from q=0 to wherever the SAS pattern is assumed to end and the diffraction pattern starts. It is also assumed that the density does not vary in the liquid or inside the particles, i.e. there is binary contrast.

SAXS is described in terms of the electronic density where SANS is described in terms of a neutron scattering length density.

=== Porod's law ===
At wave numbers that are relatively large on the scale of SAS, but still small when compared to wide-angle Bragg diffraction, local interface intercorrelations are probed, whereas correlations between opposite interface segments are averaged out. For smooth interfaces, one obtains Porod's law:
$$I(q) \sim Sq^{-4}$$

This allows the surface area S of the particles to be determined with SAS. This needs to be modified if the interface is rough on the scale q^{−1}. If the roughness can be described by a fractal dimension d between 2-3 then Porod's law becomes:
$$I(q) \sim S' q^{-(6-d)}$$

=== Scattering from particles ===
Small-angle scattering from particles can be used to determine the particle shape or their size distribution. A small-angle scattering pattern can be fitted with intensities calculated from different model shapes when the size distribution is known. If the shape is known, a size distribution may be fitted to the intensity. Typically one assumes the particles to be spherical in the latter case.

Form factor of a spherical nanoparticle analyzed through a Huygens-Fresnel-Feynman arrow-adding construction.

If the particles are in solution and known to have uniform size dispersity, then a typical strategy is to measure different concentrations of particles in the solution. From the SAXS patterns obtained one can extrapolate to the intensity pattern one would get for a single particle. This is a necessary procedure that eliminates the concentration effect, which is a small shoulder that appears in the intensity patterns due to the proximity of neighbouring particles. The average distance between particles is then roughly the distance 2π/q*, where q* is the position of the shoulder on the scattering vector range q. The shoulder thus comes from the structure of the solution and this contribution is called the structure factor. One can write for the small-angle X-ray scattering intensity:
$$I(q) = P(q)S(q) ,$$
where

- $I(q)$ is the intensity as a function of the magnitude $q$ of the scattering vector
- $P(q)$ is the form factor
- and $S(q)$ is the structure factor.

When the intensities from low concentrations of particles are extrapolated to infinite dilution, the structure factor is equal to 1 and no longer disturbs the determination of the particle shape from the form factor $P(q)$. One can then easily apply the Guinier approximation (also called Guinier law, after André Guinier), which applies only at the very beginning of the scattering curve, at small q-values. According to the Guinier approximation the intensity at small q depends on the radius of gyration of the particle.

An important part of the particle shape determination is usually the distance distribution function $p(r)$, which may be calculated from the intensity using a Fourier transform

$$p(r) = \frac{r^2}{2\pi^2}\int_0^\infty I(q)\frac{\sin qr}{qr}q^2dq.$$

The distance distribution function $p(r)$ is related to the frequency of certain distances $r$ within the particle. Therefore, it goes to zero at the largest diameter of the particle. It starts from zero at $r = 0$ due to the multiplication by $r^2$. The shape of the $p(r)$-function already tells something about the shape of the particle. If the function is very symmetric, the particle is also highly symmetric, like a sphere. The distance distribution function should not be confused with the size distribution.

The particle shape analysis is especially popular in biological small-angle X-ray scattering, where one determines the shapes of proteins and other natural colloidal polymers.

== History ==
Small-angle scattering studies were initiated by André Guinier (1937). Subsequently, Peter Debye, Otto Kratky, Günther Porod, R. Hosemann and others developed the theoretical and experimental fundamentals of the method and they were established until around 1960. Later on, new progress in refining the method began in the 1970s and is continuing today.

== Organisations ==
As a 'low resolution' diffraction technique, the worldwide interests of the small-angle scattering community are promoted and coordinated by the Commission on Small-Angle Scattering of the International Union of Crystallography (IUCr/CSAS). There are also a number of community-led networks and projects. One such network, canSAS - the acronym stands for Collective Action for Nomadic Small-Angle Scatterers, emphasising the global nature of the technique, champions the development of instrumental calibration standards and data file formats.

== International conferences ==
There is a long history of international conferences on small-angle scattering. These are hosted independently by individual organizations wishing to host the conference. The hosts of the conference are often collaborating with the IUCr/CSAS on the conference details. Since 2006, the sequence of conferences has been held at three year intervals. Attendees at the conference will vote on bids to host the next conference(s).

=== Conference history ===
- 2024, XIX, Taipei, ROC Taiwan
- 2022, XVIII, Campinas, Brazil
- 2018, XVII, Traverse City, Michigan, US
- 2015, XVI, Berlin, Germany
- 2012, XV, Sydney, Australia
- 2009, XIV, Oxford, UK
- 2006, XIII, Kyoto, Japan
- 2002, XII, Venice, Italy
- 1999, XI, Upton, New York, US
- 1996, X, Campinas, Brazil
- 1993, IX, Saclay, France
- 1990, VIII, Leuven, Belgium
- 1987, VII, Prague, Czechoslovakia
- 1983, VI, Hamburg, Germany
- 1980, V, Berlin, Germany
- 1977, IV, Gatlinburg, Tennessee, US
- 1973, III, Grenoble, France
- 1970, II, Graz, Austria
- 1965, I, Syracuse, New York, US

=== Awards ===
Several awards are presented at the international conference.

==== André Guinier Prize ====
The André Guinier Prize (in honor of André Guinier) is given for lifetime achievement, a major breakthrough, or an outstanding contribution to the field of small-angle scattering. This award is sponsored by the IUCr and the conference organizers. Previous recipients of the Guinier prize:

- 2022 – Jill Trewhella (University of Sydney, Australia)
- 2018 – Dmitri Svergun (EMBL, Germany)
- 2015 – Sow-Hsin Chen (MIT, US)
- 2012 – Otto Glatter (University of Graz, Austria)
- 2009 – Vittorio Luzzati (Centre de Génétique Moléculaire, CNRS, Gif-sur-Yvette, France)
- 2006 – Heinrich B. Stuhrmann (GKSS Forschungszentrum Geesthacht, Germany)
- 2002 – Michael Agamalian (ORNL, Oak Ridge, TN, US)

==== Otto Kratky Prize ====
The Otto Kratky Prize is awarded to an outstanding young scientist working in SAXS. This award is sponsored by Anton Paar. To be eligible, you must be a fully registered attendee at the international conference of that year, be author or co-author on an abstract utilizing SAXS, and either less than 35 years of age or fewer than five years since the date of PhD graduation.

The prize jury is assembled by the conference organizers and staff of Anton Paar.

Previous recipients of the Kratky prize:

- 2022 – Malina Seyffertitz (Montanuniversität Leoben, Austria)
- 2018 – Andreas Haahr Larsen (University of Copenhagen, Denmark)
- 2015 – Marianne Liebi (PSI, Switzerland)
- 2012 – Ilja Voets (TU Eindhoven)
- 2009 – Cedric Gommes (University of Liege, Belgium)

== Textbooks ==
- André Guinier, Gerard Fournet: Small-angle scattering of x-rays. New York: John Wiley & Sons (1955)
- O. Glatter, Otto Kratky (eds.): Small Angle X-ray Scattering. London: Academic Press (1982). Out of print.
- Ian Hamley Small-Angle Scattering: Theory, Instrumentation, Data, and Applications. Chichester: John Wiley (2022).
