= Density meter =

Device that measures density of a substance

A density meter (densimeter) is a device which measures the density of an object or material. Density is usually abbreviated as either $\rho$ or $D$. Typically, density either has the units of $kg/m^3$ or $lb/ft^3$. The most basic principle of how density is calculated is by the formula:

$$\rho = \frac {m} {V}$$

Where:

$\rho$ = the density of the sample.
$m$ = the mass of the sample.
$V$ = the volume of the sample.

Many density meters can measure both the wet portion and the dry portion of a sample. The wet portion comprises the density from all liquids present in the sample. The dry solids comprise solely of the density of the solids present in the sample.

A density meter does not measure the specific gravity of a sample directly. However, the specific gravity can be inferred from a density meter. The specific gravity is defined as the density of a sample compared to the density of a reference. The reference density is typically of that of water. The specific gravity is found by the following equation:

$$SG_s = \frac {\rho_s} {\rho_r}$$

Where:

$SG_s$ = the specific gravity of the sample.
$\rho_s$ = the density of the sample that needs to be measured.
$\rho_r$ = the density of the reference material (usually water).

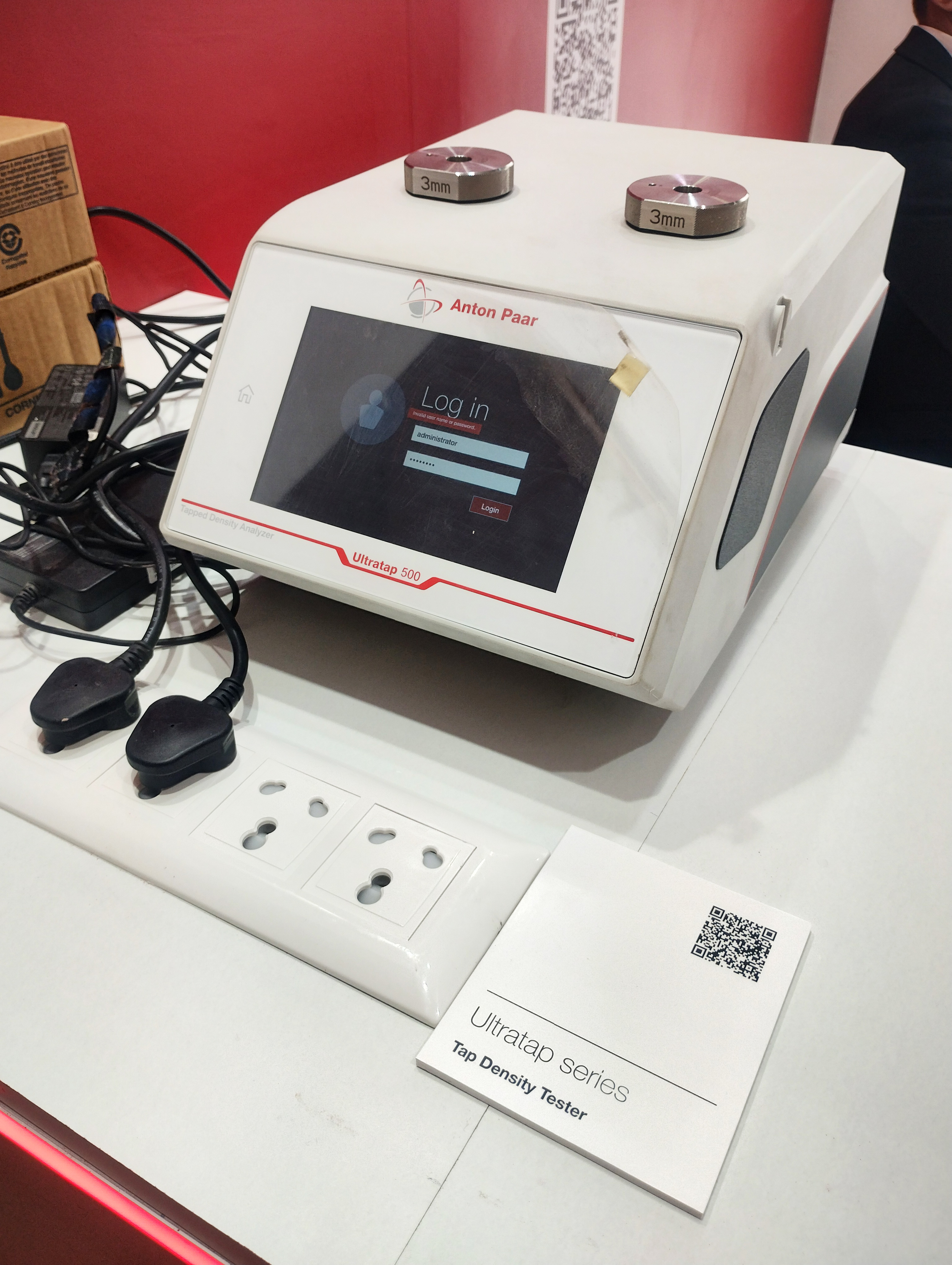
Anton Paar Ultratap series Tap Density Tester at DEF-TECH Bharat 2026, KTPO, Bengaluru

Density meters come in many varieties. Different types include: nuclear, coriolis, ultrasound, microwave, and gravitic. Each type measures the density differently. Each type has its advantages and drawbacks.

Density meters have many applications in various parts of various industries. Density meters are used to measure slurries, sludges, and other liquids that flow through the pipeline. Industries such as mining, dredging, wastewater treatment, paper, oil, and gas all have uses for density meters at various points during their respective processes.

== Different types of density meter ==
=== Coriolis ===
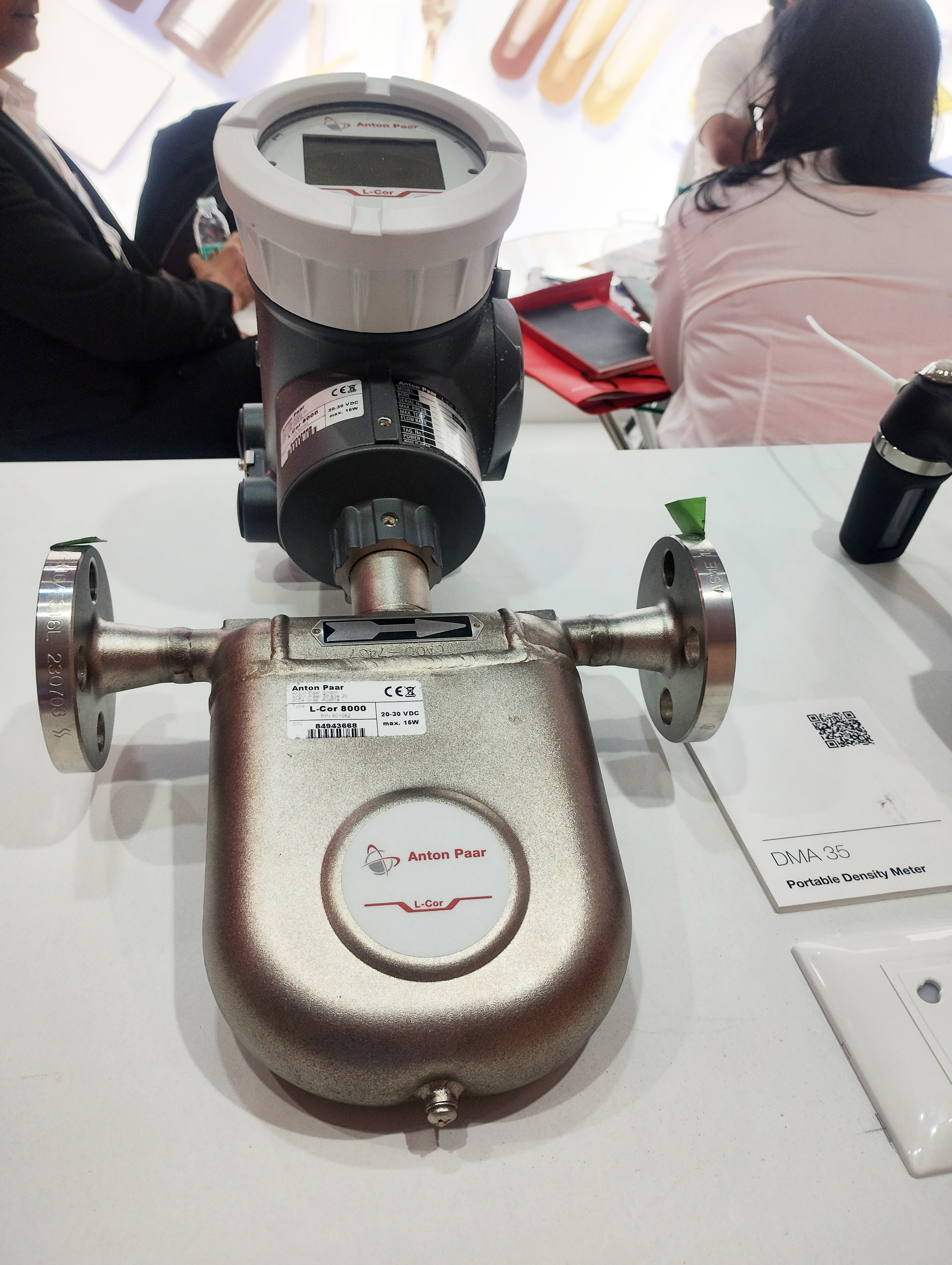
Anton Paar Coriolis Flow Meter: L-Cor 8000 at DEF-TECH Bharat 2026, KTPO, Bengaluru

Coriolis density meters, also known as mass flow meters or inertial flow meters, work on the principle of vibration to measure phase shifts in the vibration of a bent thin walled tube. The bent thin walled tube is rotated around a central axis. When there is no mass in the bent section, the tube remains untwisted. However, when the density inside the bent section increases, the inbound flow portion of the bent pipe drags behind the out flow portion. This twisting causes phase shifts which result in changes in the resonant frequency of the thin walled tube. Therefore, the resonant frequency is directly affected by the density. Higher density media causes a larger Coriolis effect if the volumetric flow rate is constant. Flowing media causes a frequency and a phase shift of the bent pipe, which are proportional to the mass flow rate of the sample.

Coriolis meters measure the mass flow of the system. They do not measure the volumetric flow. However, a volumetric flow can be inferred from the mass flow measurement. These measurements are restricted to small diameters for flow tubes. However, this measurement technique results in high accuracy and high repeatability. Coriolis meters also have a fast response time.

Coriolis meters need to be calibrated for temperature and pressure. The zero points for these values are used to calibrate the system. Coriolis meters cannot be calibrated while in use. The span difference is used to see how temperature and pressure have changed.

=== Nuclear ===
Nuclear density meters work on the principle of measuring gamma radiation. Gamma radiation is emitted from a source. This source is typically caesium-137 (half-life: ~30 years). The radiation is seen by a scintillator device. The radiation is converted into flashes of light. The number of flashes of light is counted. Radiation that is absorbed by the mass is not seen by the scintillator device. Therefore, the density of the media is inversely proportional to the radiation captured and seen by the scintillator.

Nuclear density meters are limited in scope to what is seen by the gamma radiation beam. The sample size is a single, thin column with small longitudinal length.

Nuclear equipment requires certified and licensed staff in order to operate the instruments.

=== Microwave ===
Microwave density meters have various ways to measure what solids are in the sample. All microwave meters measure microwaves but some use different methods such as measuring the microwave propagation speed change, amplitude reduction, time of flight, single phase difference, or dual phase shift. Each technique has certain accuracies.

Some microwave meters use a ceramic probe that is directly inserted into the sample. This allows the meter to have direct contact to the sample in question. However, this limits the types of slurries and sludges that can flow through the pipe line. Abrasive slurries with particulates can damage the sensor probe.

Microwave meters are also limited to liquids with unvarying dielectric constants. The percentage of solids of the slurry affects the dielectric constant for the entire sample. Typically, percent solids greater than 20% result in large errors. Similar inconsistencies happen with large pipe diameters.

Microwave meters are very good at detecting dissolved solids. Homogeneous solutions are easily seen by microwave meters. This makes them a fit for applications where the solution is consistent and non-abrasive.

=== Ultrasonic ===
Ultrasonic density meters work on various principles to calculate the density. One of the methods is the transit-time principle (also known as the time of flight principle). With this technique, a sensor is typically installed in the pipe, which has an ultrasonic transmitter and an ultrasonic receiver in one construction. The ultrasonic density meter calculates the sonic velocity by using the known distance between the transmitter and receiver and the measured transit time. The measuring instrument can now calculate the density, as it is dependent on the sound velocity.

Another method that is utilized in ultrasonic meters is the envelope energy average method. This method is based on not only the amplitude of the signal but also the shape of the signal. These packets of information are called envelopes.

Doppler ultrasonic meters measure the suspension flow where the concentration of solids in the slurry is above 100ppm and the particles that are suspended are larger than 100 microns in diameter. However, the Doppler method only works on concentrations of less than 10% solids.

=== Oscillating U-tube ===
The oscillating U-tube is a technique used to determine the density of liquids and gases. It is based on measuring the frequency shift of an oscillator caused by the change in mass introduced by the sample. This measurement principle is based on a mass-spring-damper model. When the sample is filled into the hollow U-tube, its mass influences the oscillator’s eigenfrequency. Through electronic excitation (e.g., electromagnetic or piezoelectric), the U-tube is excited into undamped oscillation at its resonance frequency. Optical readout of the oscillation frequency allows precise determination of the frequency change induced by the sample. Using the well-defined volume of the U-tube, the sample’s density can be determined with high accuracy.

== Compensations ==
=== Temperature ===
Temperature affects the density of fluids. In most cases, an increase in temperature indicates that the density of the media will decrease. This indicates that temperature and density are inversely proportional to each other. Temperature also affects the meters themselves. Mass flow meters have different resonant frequencies at different temperatures.

=== Pressure ===
Pressure changes the rigidity of the mass flow tube. Pressure affects the rigidity of gravimetric meters.

=== Vibration ===
Vibration from plant noise can be filtered out. Vibration is apparent in microwave, ultrasonic, gravimetric, and Coriolis meters. Vibration causes these types of meters to accumulate error

=== Damage ===
Coriolis meters have compensations from pitting, cracking, coating, erosion, and corrosion. These damages affect the way that the tube resonates. These changes affect the baseline. Compensations cannot be made dynamically. These damages typically cause offsets that can be added to the existing calibration factors that will ensure that a consistent reading is still acquired.
