= André Guinier =

French physicist (1911–2000)

- Born: 1 August 1911; Nancy, France
- Died: 3 July 2000 (aged 88); Paris, France
- Citizenship: France
- Education: École Normale Supérieure
- Known for: Small-angle X-ray scattering Guinier camera Guinier law Guinier plot Guinier–Preston zone
- Father: Philibert Guinier
- Awards: Gregori Aminoff Prize (1985); Three Physicists Prize (1972)
- Scientific career
- Fields: Physicist
- Workplaces: Conservatoire National des Arts et Métiers (CNAM), University of Paris, Centre national de la recherche scientifique (CNRS)
- Doctoral advisor: Charles Mauguin
- Doctoral students: Raimond Castaing; Constantino Tsallis

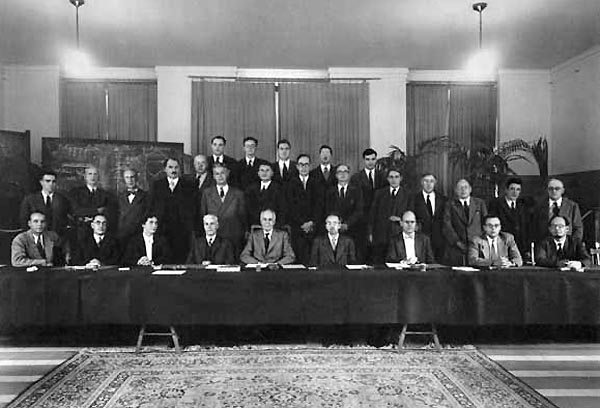
Solvay Conference on Physics in Brussels 1951. Left to right, sitting: Crussaro, N.P. Allen, Cauchois, Borelius, Bragg, Moller, Sietz, Hollomon, Frank; middle row: Rathenau, Koster, Rudberg, Flamache, Goche, Groven, Orowan, Burgers, Shockley, Guinier, C.S. Smith, Dehlinger, Laval, Henriot; top row: Gaspart, Lomer, Cottrell, Homes, Curien

André Guinier (1 August 1911 – 3 July 2000) was a French physicist and crystallographer who did pioneering work in the field of X-ray diffraction and solid-state physics. He was credited for the discovery and developments of small-angle X-ray scattering (SAXS) into an indispensable tool for materials science and crystallography.

== Education and career ==
Guinier was born in Nancy, France, his father Philibert Guinier was a botanist and director of the Nancy branch of the French National School of Forestry. Guinier studied at Lycée Henri-Poincaré before entering the École Normale Supérieure (ENS), where he studied physics from 1930 to 1934. After graduation, he worked as an agrégé-preparateur in the physics laboratory of ENS. In 1939, Guinier discovered SAXS and received his doctorate with a thesis on X-ray crystallography under Charles Mauguin. He then worked at the Conservatoire National des Arts et Métiers, where he became deputy director of the test laboratory in 1944 and further developed the SAXS technique along with his PhD student Gérard Fournet. In 1949 he became a professor at the Sorbonne University. At the end of the 1950s, as its first dean, he was involved in the construction of the new university campus in Orsay, which later became the University of Paris-Sud. During this period, he moved his research laboratory there from the center of Paris and founded the Laboratory for Solid State Physics (Laboratoire de Physique des Solides, LPS) with Jacques Friedel and Raimond Castaing. Guinier became its first director when the LPS was assimilated into the French National Centre for Scientific Research.

Guinier was president of the International Union of Crystallography from 1969 to 1972. From 1968 to 1969, he was the founding editor of the Journal of Applied Crystallography. He was elected to the French Academy of Sciences in 1971 and won the Gregori Aminoff Prize in 1985. Guinier was elected member of the Academia Europaea in 1993.

== Discoveries and inventions ==
In the field of small-angle scattering, Guinier discovered the relationship of particle size to intensity which is called Guinier's Law. He developed the Guinier camera for use in X-ray diffraction and contributed to the development of the electron microprobe by Raimond Castaing.

The Guinier-Preston zone was named after Guinier and the British physicist George Dawson Preston, who discovered and described the phenomenon independently around 1938.

== Publications ==
- Guinier, André (1952). X-ray Crystallographic Technology. Hilger and Watts, Hilger Division.
- Guinier, André; Fournet, Gérard (1955). Small-angle Scattering of X-rays (PDF). Wiley. ISBN 978-0-598-66993-3.
- Guinier, A.; von Eller, G.; Bouman, J.; Fournet, G.; Beeman, W. W.; Kaesberg, P.; Raether, H.; Ringo, G. R. (1957). Structural Research / Strukturforschung. Encyclopedia of Physics / Handbuch der Physik. Vol. 6 / 32. Berlin, Heidelberg: Springer Berlin Heidelberg. doi:10.1007/978-3-642-45866-8. ISBN 978-3-642-45868-2.
- Guinier, André; Dexter, David Lawrence (1963). X-ray Studies of Materials. Interscience Publishers. ISBN 978-0-470-33268-9.
- Guinier, André (1984). The structure of matter: from the blue sky to liquid crystals. London: Arnold. ISBN 978-0-7131-3489-6.
- Guinier, André; Jullien, Rémi (1989). The solid state: from superconductors to superalloys. International Union of Crystallography texts on crystallography. International Union of Crystallography. Oxford, New York: Oxford University Press. ISBN 978-0-19-855290-1.
- Guinier, André (1994). X-ray diffraction in crystals, imperfect crystals, and amorphous bodies. New York: Dover. ISBN 978-0-486-68011-8. (translated from Guinier, A. (1964). Théorie et technique de la radiocristallographie (in French). Paris: Dunod. OCLC 301350191.)
- Williams, Claudine E.; May, Roland P.; Guinier, André (1999-06-24), "Small-Angle Scattering of X-Rays and Neutrons", in Lifshin, Eric (ed.), X-ray Characterization of Materials, Wiley, pp. 211–254, doi:10.1002/9783527613748.ch4, ISBN 978-3-527-29657-6

== See also ==
- Electron microprobe
