= Oscillating U-tube =

Technique to determine the density of fluids

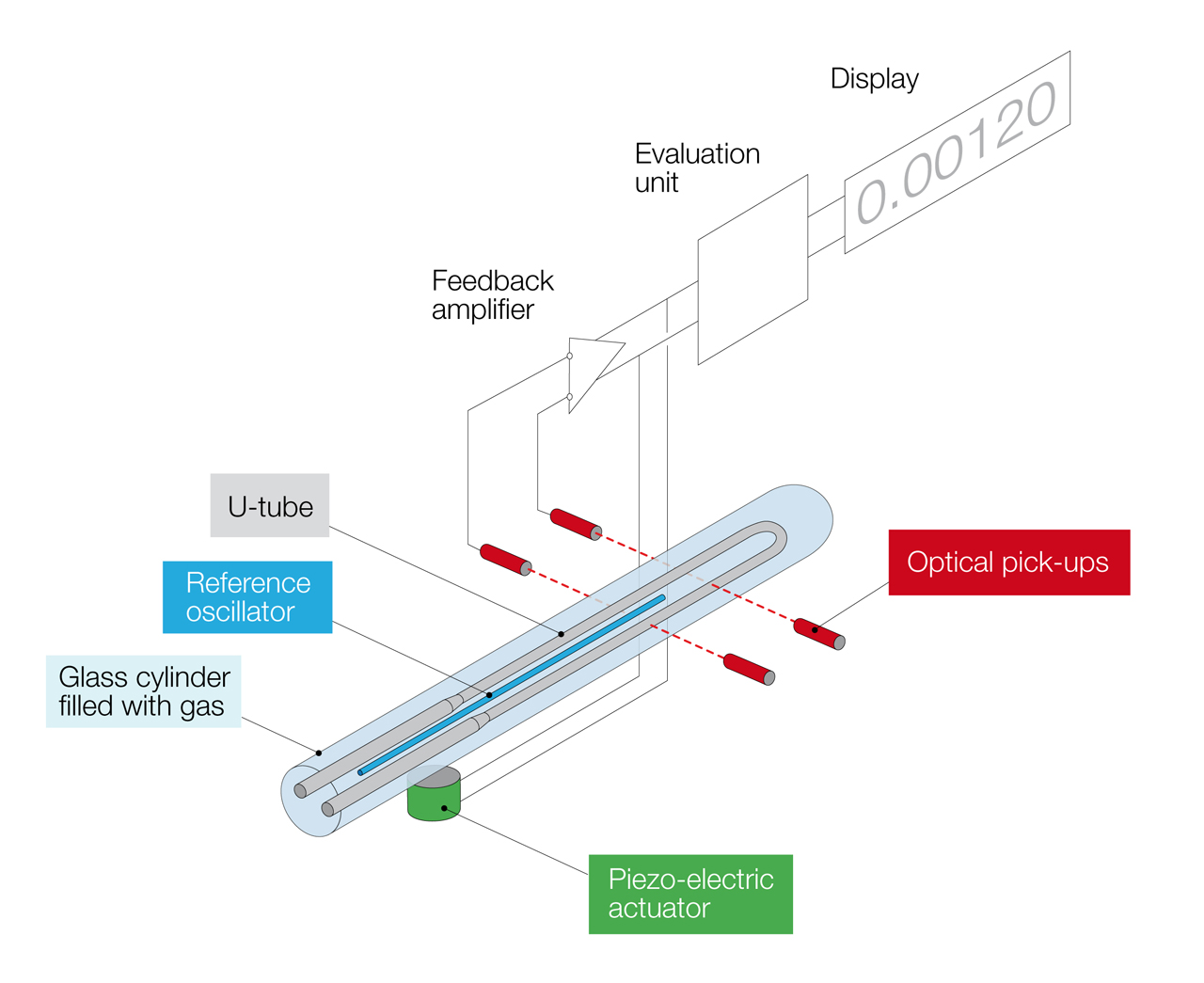
U-tube with piezo-electric actuator

Digital density measuring principle

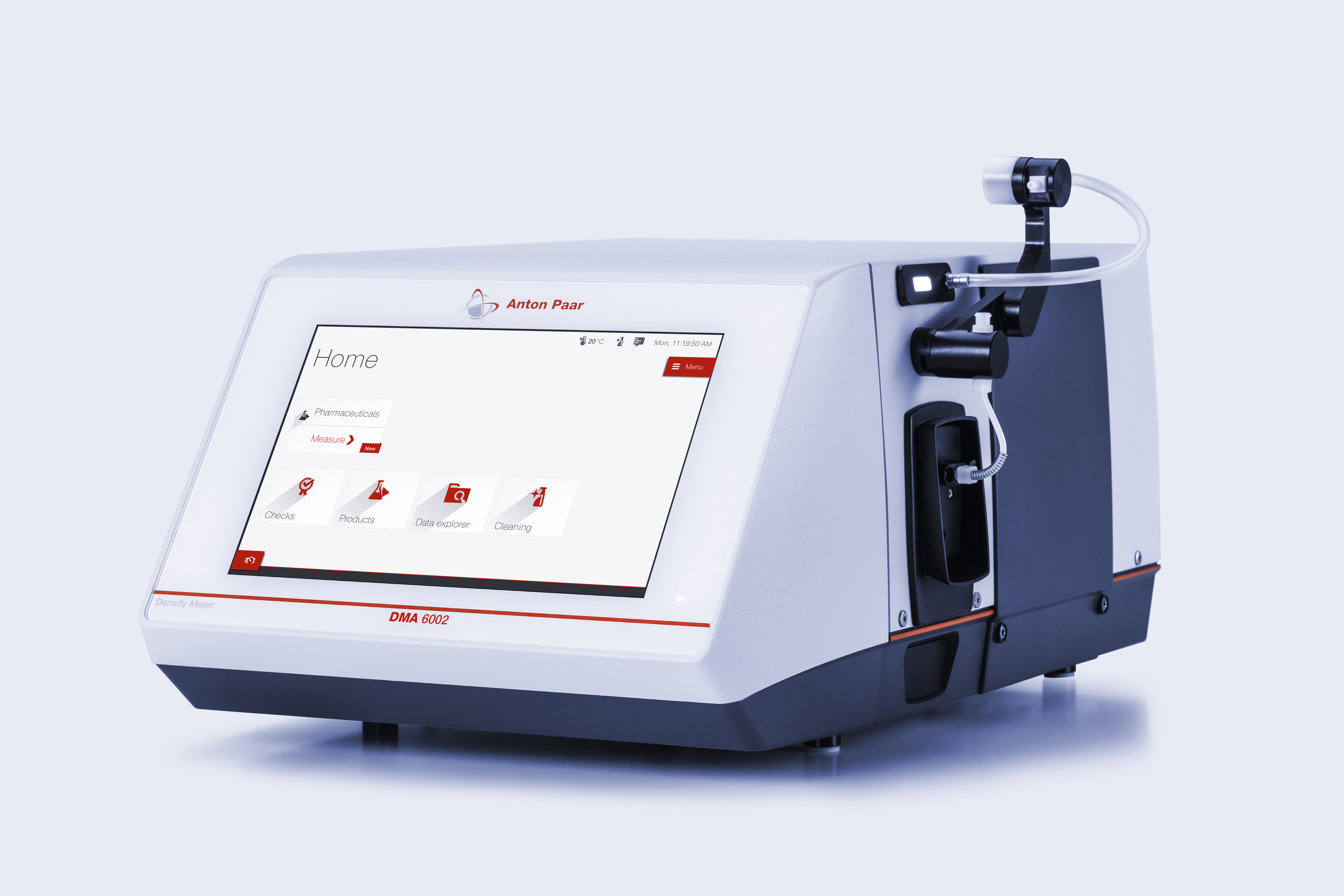
Digital Density Meter with oscillating U-tube.

The oscillating U-tube is a technique used to determine the density of liquids and gases by measuring the frequency shift of an oscillator caused by the change in mass introduced by the sample. This measuring principle is based on a mass-spring-damper model.

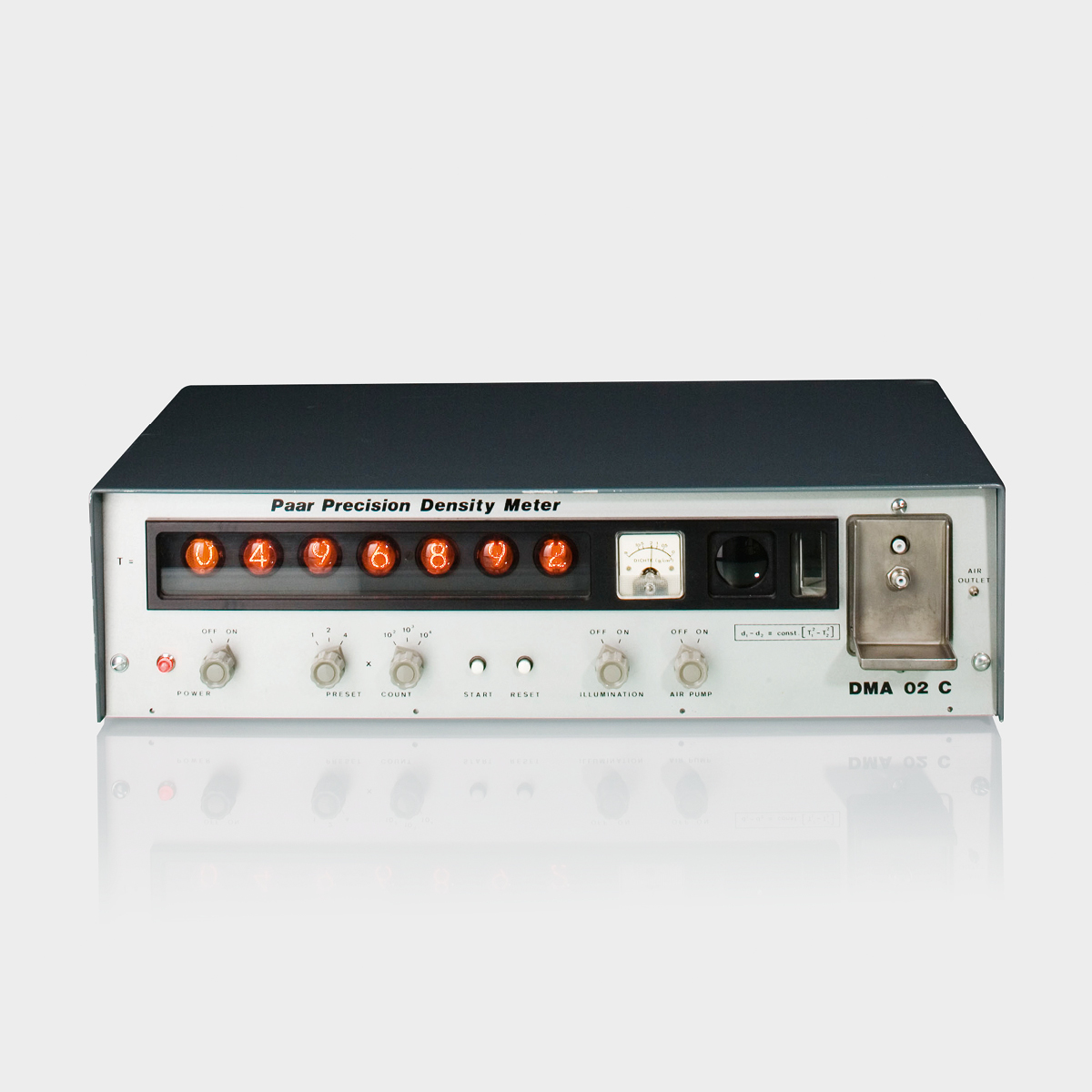
The world's first digital density meter introduced in the 1960s.

The sample is introduced into a tube capable of oscillation. The oscillator’s eigenfrequency is influenced by the sample's mass. This tube is a hollow, U-shaped structure that is electronically excited (e.g., electromagnetic or piezoelectric) into undamped oscillation at its resonance frequency. This can be done via either constant or pulsed excitation. The two branches of the U-shaped oscillator act as its spring elements.

In the fundamental mode, the direction of oscillation is normal to the plane of the two branches. The oscillator's eigenfrequency is influenced only by the portion of the sample that participates in the oscillation. The oscillating volume is limited by the stationary nodes located at the bearing points. By completely filling the oscillator up to these bearing points, the volume participating in the oscillation is well defined. Therefore, the measured mass can be used to calculate the sample’s density with high accuracy.

Overfilling the oscillator beyond the bearing points does not affect the measurement. For this reason, the oscillator can also be used to measure the density of flowing sample media (continuous measurement), enabling inline process monitoring.

Depending on the application, different oscillator geometries may be employed. The three most common types of oscillators used for density determination are Y-, X-, and W-oscillators. The following descriptions of their oscillations refer to the respective fundamental modes. Y-oscillators are mostly found in tabletop instruments. In this design, the U-tube is mounted on one side and oscillates normal to the plane of its two branches. For Y-type oscillators, a counterweight is required. X-oscillators are U-tubes fixed on both sides, allowing only the two straight branches to oscillate relative to each other in opposite directions. W-oscillators (also called double-Y-oscillators) feature an additional bend, creating two “wings” that oscillate in opposite directions.

Oscillating U-tubes are typically made of borosilicate glass because of its excellent chemical resistance and transparency, which allows visual detection of bubbles or particles that may be present in the sample and thus falsify the measurement. Alternatively, a U-tube made of special metal alloys, such as Hastelloy, can be used for samples that would otherwise attack the glass.

In modern digital density meters, piezo elements are commonly used to excite the U-tube, while optical pickups determine the period of oscillation. This period τ can be measured with high resolution and has a simple relationship to the density ρ of the sample in the oscillator:

$$\rho = A \cdot \tau^2 - B$$

A and B are instrument constants of the respective oscillator. Their values can be determined by calibrating with two certified reference materials (CRMs) with precisely known densities ρ₁ and ρ₂. Air and water are frequently used as reference materials, although CRMs with properties closer to the sample may be used to achieve higher accuracy.

Because density is temperature dependent, precise temperature control is essential. Modern digital density meters typically use Peltier elements for this purpose, allowing both heating and cooling of the sample. Another factor affecting the density measurement is the sample’s viscosity. High viscosity leads to disproportionately strong damping due to shear forces between the sample and the cell walls, resulting in an overestimation of the density. To prevent this, the fact that viscosity-induced damping affects different oscillator modes to different degrees is exploited. By measuring several modes, the influence of viscosity can be quantified and compensated accordingly.

Another source of interference in oscillator-based density measurements is parasitic resonances. To prevent the oscillator from exciting other components of the measurement system—or vice versa—it must be mechanically decoupled from the housing. In addition, a sufficiently large counterweight with a resonance frequency far below that of the measuring oscillator prevents shifts of the oscillation nodes. The same effect can be achieved by modifying the oscillator geometry. A counter-oscillating X- or W-shaped oscillator operates in a self-compensating manner.

To better compensate for long-term drift and temperature influences, modern density meters often employ an additional reference oscillator.

In 1967, the company Anton Paar GmbH presented the first digital density meter for liquids and gases employing the oscillating U-tube principle at ACHEMA. Today, in addition to tabletop instruments, process sensors and hand-held devices are also available.

== Sources ==
- Otto Kratky et al., ''Device for density determination.'' US Patent 3523446, https://patents.google.com/patent/US3523446
- Stabinger, Hans: "Density Measurement using modern oscillating transducers", South Yorkshire Trading Standards Unit, Sheffield 1994
- ISO 15212-1
