= List of publications by Yvette Cauchois =

This is a list of publications by Yvette Cauchois.

== Publications ==
1. Nouvelles mesures et observations relatives au spectre Lα d´émission du platine
2. Nouvelles mesures et observations relatives aux émissions L hors diagramme du mercure, du platine et du tungstène
3. Nouvelles données sur le spectre K du cuivre
4. Les spectres L d'émission et d'absorption du rhenium et ses niveaux caractéristiques
5. Spectrographe « universel » pour les rayons X, utilisable jusqu'à 20 Å
6. The recent X-ray spectroscopic work at University of Paris
7. The Disintegration of As74
8. Atomes, Spectres, Matière
9. Dosimétrie X relative à un accélérateur d'électrons utilisé sous 0,2 à 1 Mv
10. Accélérateur d'électrons utilisé jusqu'à 1 MeV comme source d'électrons et de rayons X pour études physicochimiques
11. Emploi de silicates naturels à grand paramètre pour les spectrographes et monochromateurs à rayons X mous
12. L’œuvre vivante de Jean Perrin en Chimie Physique
13. Hommage à Edmond Bauer
14. La spectroscopie X
15. Introduction à l'Emploi de Rayonnements en Chimie physique
16. Photoactivation nucléaire du 77Se, 107,109Ar, 111Cd, 115In et 199Hg
17. Photoactivation nucléaire de 115In
18. Remarques sur l'emploi de monocristaux d'aluminium en optique et spectroscopie X
19. Fluorescence nucléaire de 115In
20. Méthode d'étude de la distribution spatiotemporelle d'un faisceau électronique pulsé de grande puissance
21. Etalonnage de detecteurs semi-conducteurs au silicium par le faisceau d'un accelerateur d'electrons de 2 MeV
22. Diffusion multiple d'électrons par un milieu atomique amorphe
23. Spectrographe a cristal convexe adapte a l'etude de l'emission X de plasmas denses
24. AGLAE: an efficient pulsed keV range X-ray source and its spectroscopy diagnosis
25. Pt Platinum
26. Ru, Rh, Pd, Os, Ir, and Pt Isotopes
27. Ru, Rh, Pd, Os, Ir, and Pt Atoms and Atomic Ions
28. Ru, Rh, Pd, Os, Ir, and Pt Molecules and Clusters
29. Renewal Of Some Curved-Crystal Techniques In X-Ray Spectrometry And Imaging
30. New Means and Objectives in the X and X-UV Spectroscopy and Imagery
31. Study of nuclear states of natural isotopes by resonance or fluorescence with bremsstrahlung X-rays
