= Laboratoire de Physique des Solides =

Research institute of the Paris-Saclay University

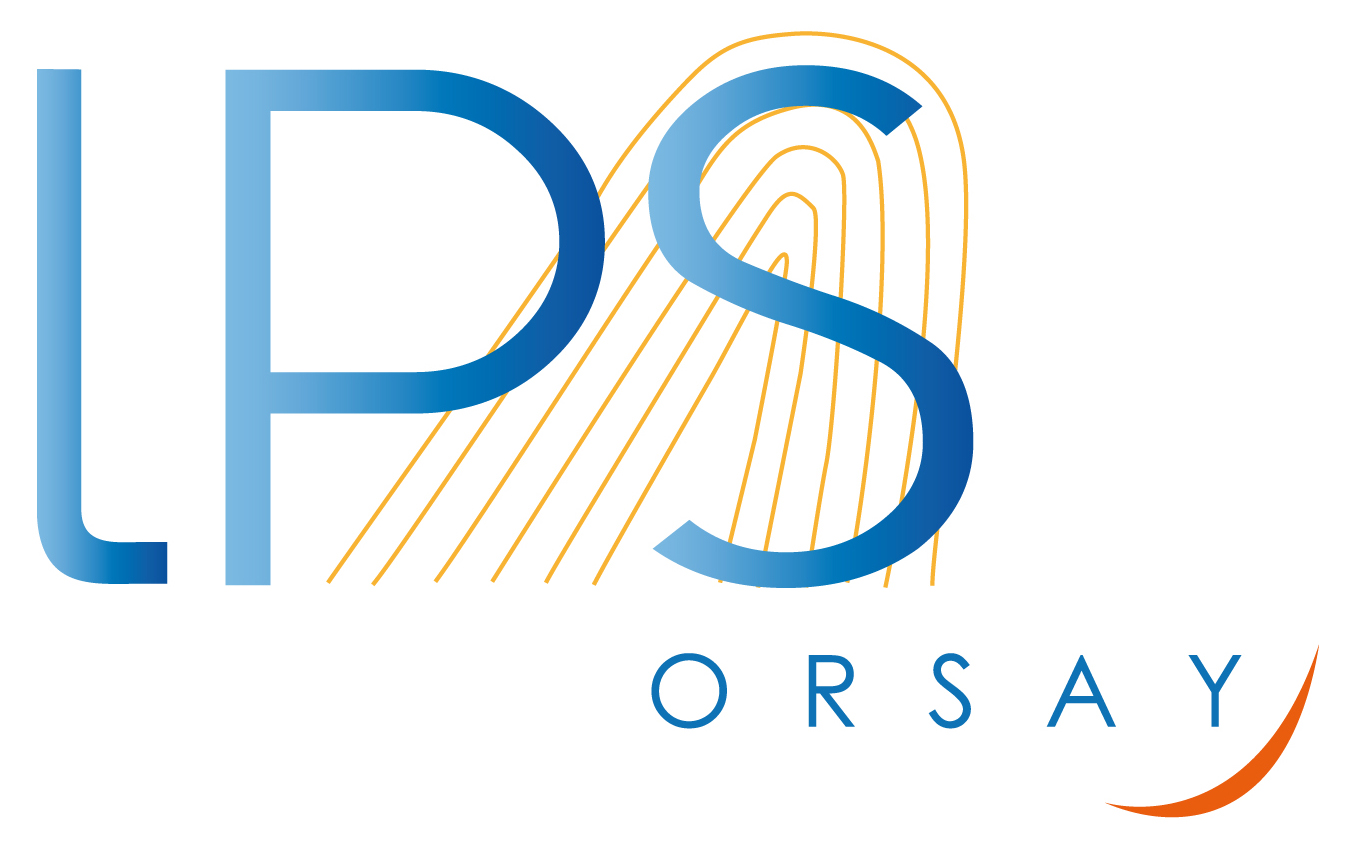
- Established: 1959
- Mission: Fundamental research
- Location: Orsay, France
- Coordinates: 48.707134°N 2.179332°E
- Interactive map of Laboratoire de Physique des Solides
- Website: https://www.lps.u-psud.fr/en
- Position in France

The Laboratory of Solid State Physics (LPS) is a research institute of the Paris-Saclay University, associated to the National Center of Scientific Research (CNRS) as a joint research unit (French UMR 8502). It is located in Orsay, France, about 25 km southwest of Paris.

== Research ==
The physics of condensed matter is addressed in all its diversity, but the current activities can be loosely divided into three main topics, each one involving about thirty permanent researchers:

- New electronic states of matter
- Physical phenomena with reduced dimensions
- Soft matter and physics-biology interface

Topic 1: theoretical and experimental studies, related to the properties of correlated fermions (superconductivity, magnetism, metal–insulator transition, and so on). Research fields variate from low dimension conductors and superconductivity to Quantum Hall effects and Kondo effect and heavy fermions.

Topic 2: studies related to "nanosciences", broadly speaking. They are approached from the point of view of fundamental properties, and cover the situation when the size of an object becomes comparable to certain characteristic scales (coherence length, mean free path, etc.). Among the research fields there are the thermodynamics of nanostructures, the magnetization dynamics of magnetic materials, the (quantum) electronic properties at low temperatures and others. Used physical techniques: low-energy electron diffraction, high-energy electron spectroscopy and microscopy, X-Ray scattering, ion desorption by impact of very low energy electrons, and optical microscopy.

Topic 3: studies of "soft matter" including biological systems. Topics range from complex systems to living tissues, from liquid crystals to foams, passing through polymers or granular systems. These studies are often done at the interface with physical chemistry and biology. For studying scientists use theoretical and numerical analysis and modelizations.

== Teaching ==
The faculty (but also the CNRS researchers) are actively involved in various undergraduate and graduate courses and programs aimed at students of the Orsay and Paris universities and at students of engineering schools ("Grandes Écoles"). The laboratory hosts a graduate program leading to a degree in solid state physics: the "Physics of Condensed Matter" master, common to the Paris VI, VII and XI universities, to the École Normale Supérieure and to the École Polytechnique.

More generally, research and technical training is a major concern of the laboratory, which, besides PhD students, hosts a large number of interns at many levels.

== Outreach ==
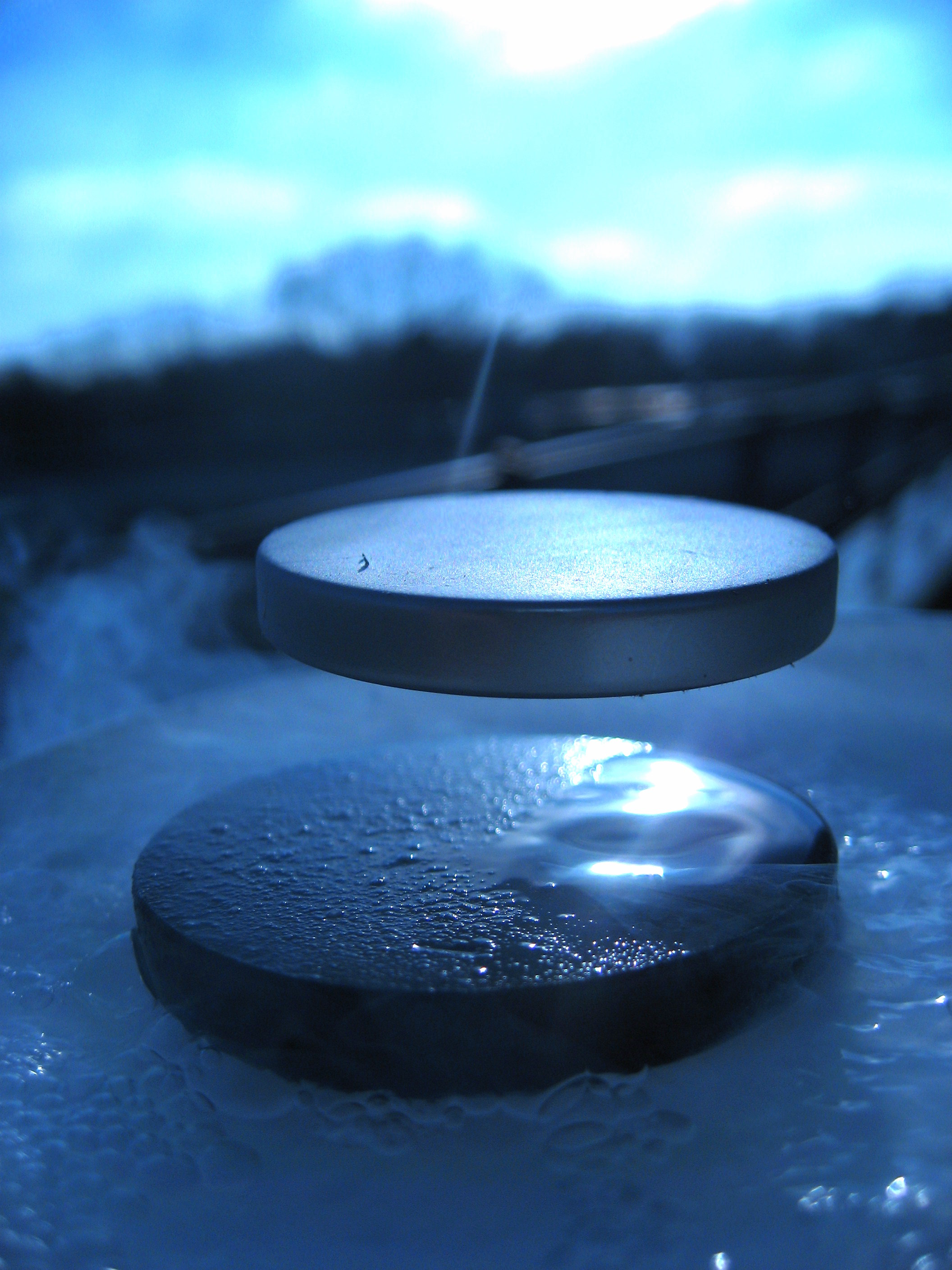
Magnet levitating above a superconductor.

The laboratory hosts a "Physics reimagined" research team entirely dedicated to innovating the way modern physics is taught for the general public. Collaborating with designers, museums and students, the team creates different tools, such as 3D animations, science graphs, folding hands-on and project about quantum physics as seen by designers, that help simplify understanding of complex areas of physics. "Physics reimagined" invited illustrator Heloise Chochois to create the comic about how the life of a physicist looks inside. Among other things, the team engages in research activities related to the science communication, interdisciplinarity and innovative pedagogies.

Other major contributions are the involvement in large-scale actions such as:

- 2011, Year of Supraconductivity
- 2014, International Year of Crystallography

== History ==
The Laboratory of Solid State Physics was founded by André Guinier, Jacques Friedel and Raimond Castaing in 1959 on the Orsay campus.

The laboratory had been based in building 210, built for the École Normale, until 1970. Then the LPS was moved to building 510 on the Moulon plateau that it still occupies. In 1966 the laboratory was part of the Centre de la Recherche Scientifique (CNRS).

Three founders of the laboratory with Pierre-Gilles have established and developed there three research features that are still presented: reach a relation between material properties and the problems of matter organization, couple experiment with theory and develop physical instrumentation for answering these questions.

French physicist Albert Fert received from the King of Sweden the medal and diplomas of the Physics Nobel Prize on 10 December 2007. The award was for discovering the giant magnetoresistance at the Laboratoire de Physique des Solides. The work had an impact on electronics created a new form of it- spintronics.
