= Philibert Guinier =

French botanist (1876-1962)

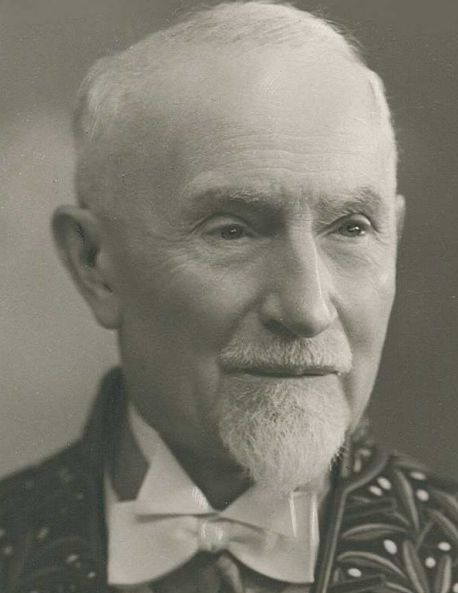
- Born: 21 June 1876; Grenoble, France
- Died: 3 April 1961 (aged 84)
- Spouse: Lucie Mathilde Le Monnier (m. 1907)
- Children: 3, including André Guinier

Philibert Guinier (French pronunciation: [filibɛʁ ɡinje]; 21 June 1876 – 3 April 1962) was a French botanist, forester and a pioneer of ecology in French.

== Education and career ==
Guinier was born in Grenoble, France as the son of Ernest Guinier (1837-1908), who is a forester. His father was also a pioneer in the study of natural sciences in forestry.

Philibert studied at the Institut national agronomique (INA) in Paris in 1895 and the French National School of Forestry (ENEF) in Nancy in 1897. He began his career as a forester in 1900 as a general guard at Grenoble, then joined the ENEF in 1901 first as attached to the Research Station then as a forestry botany lecturer from 1903 to 1941. He was director of the French National School of Forestry for 20 years, from 1921 to his retirement in 1941. He thus trained hundreds of forestry officers in biology.

After his first years as a botanist, Guinier broadened his field of knowledge and action in pedology, genetics, reforestation, pathology, and physiology thanks to his interactions with scientists such as Georges Le Monnier, Émile Schribaux, Henri Hitier, and René Maire. He participated in the French war effort in World War I in 1914, by improving the supply of wood for artillery and aviation, and undertook the first French scientific research on wood, founding xylology. In 1941, he was the author of the first AFNOR wood nomenclature. He is the successor of the phytosociologist Charles Flahault (1852-1935).

== Honors and awards ==
Guinier was the national correspondent of the Academy of Agriculture (Académie d'Agriculture) from 1923 and member in 1936. He is the leader of the French National Poplar Commission created in 1942 and the French National Walnut Commission. In 1929, Guinier was elected president of the International Union of Forest Research Organizations (IUFRO). In 1942, he took charge of the management of the Arboretum d'Harcourt. He was president of the Société botanique de France in 1946. He was elected member of the French Academy of Sciences in 1953 in the rural economy section, in the chair of Louis Lapicque (1866-1952). In 1957, he was president of the French Association for the Advancement of Sciences (Association française pour l'avancement des sciences).

== Personal life ==
In 1907, Guinier married Lucie Mathilde Le Monnier, daughter of Georges Le Monnier, in Nancy. They had two sons and a daughter, including physicist André Guinier.
