= Kenneth Henderson Jack =

British chemist and Fellow of the Royal Society

Kenneth Henderson Jack OBE FRS
- Born: 12 October 1918; North Shields
- Died: 28 January 2013 (aged 94)
- Education: Tynemouth Municipal High School
- Spouse: Alfreda Hughes
- Children: David Hughes; Stephen
- Scientific career
- Fields: X-ray crystallography Interstitial alloys[ Powder diffraction Silicon nitrides Sialons
- Workplaces: Westinghouse Electric Corporation; Thermal Syndicate Limited; Newcastle University
- Thesis: The chemistry and crystal structure of some interstitial alloys (1949)

Kenneth Henderson Jack FRS (12 October 1918—28 January 2013) was a British chemist whose career involved the application of X-ray crystallography to the field of materials science.

== Biography ==
Kenneth Henderson Jack was born on 12 October 1918 at his grandmother's flat in Coburg Street, North Shields. He was the eldest of three sons of John Henderson Jack, and Emily (née Cozens). He attended King Edward's Primary School and then Tynemouth Municipal High School. He gained a scholarship place to study chemistry at Armstrong College (later part of the Newcastle Colleges of Durham University). Jack graduated with first-class honours in chemistry and came top of his year. After a brief spell in teaching – a requirement of his scholarship – he was directed into war work at the Chemical Defence Research Establishment, Sutton Oak, before the Professor of Inorganic and Physical Chemistry, H. L. Riley brought him back to Newcastle in October 1941.

Riley led a group involved with the Ministry of Supply on armour-plated steel. Jack's work in this field came to the notice of Sir Charles Goodeve, the first director of the British Iron and Steel Research Association (BISRA), who appointed him as a Senior Scientific Officer in 1945. After a year at Newcastle, Jack moved to Cambridge for three years, to work on crystallography in W H Taylor's group with Peter Hirsch.He worked for a PhD while at Cambridge and was awarded the degree in 1949. He then returned to Newcastle as a lecturer in inorganic chemistry, while continuing his work in interstitial alloys.

In 1951 Jack was invited to give a paper at the Pittsburgh Diffraction Conference. While there he helped pay his way by giving lectures at various institutions, one of which was Westinghouse Electric Corporation. Over lunch he was told by the research director, Clarence Zener, to send for his wife and children and come to work at Westinghouse. On 11 August he and his family arrived in New York on the Mauretania, and Jack started at the 500-strong research facility, in charge of the X-ray lab. The facility was upgraded with new equipment, some of which he helped build. Although he was offered several jobs in Pittsburgh, Kenneth Jack and his family decided to return to England. They sailed from Montreal on the Empress of Scotland on 28 August 1953, bound for Liverpool.

Back at Newcastle Jack worked on developing his powder diffraction techniques. He enjoyed his teaching and research, but could gain no promotion or salary increase. After several unsuccessful applications for professorships he accepted a position in 1957 at Thermal Syndicate Limited. He had less freedom than in academia, and was required to focus on the needs of the business. He and his team developed a way ok making a much-improved version of the firm's main product: a fused quartz with the brand name Spectrosil. The new Spectrosil® WF “had outstanding optical transmission as well as a very low impurity content and found important applications in the production of optical fibres for telecommunications”.

But Newcastle beckoned again. The professor of metallurgy at Jing's College asked Kenneth Jack, in 1963, if he was interested in a recently established readership there. The outcome, in the following year, was Jack's appointment with a Personal Chair in Applied Crystal Chemistry, at what was now the University of Newcastle upon Tyne, now more usually Newcastle University. His lines of research includes a focus on silicon nitride (Si_{3}N_{4}) and its development into more complex Si-Al-O-N structures; the discovery of Guinier–Preston (GP) zones in Fe-Mo-N. The latter led to funding in 1970 from the Wolfson Foundation for a transmission electron microscope and additional staff.

The work of the growing Wolfson group “became better and better known [and] there were many invitations to give lectures overseas in Europe, the USA, Japan, India, Pakistan and China. Ken’s seven-week visit to India and Pakistan in early 1981 was particularly memorable. ”. He coined the term “sialon” to describe the Si-Al-O-N complexes. Other universities and the Joseph Lucas Group Research Centre became interested, and the Lucas group trademarked some of them Syalon®.

Jack “received many honours, prizes and awards throughout his career. In 1980 he was elected a Fellow of the Royal Society and in 1996 he was made an honorary professor at Swansea University. He was appointed OBE in 1997 and, a decade later, was made a distinguished life member of the American Ceramic Society”.

Kenneth Jack retired from the University of Newcastle in 1984.

== Family ==
Kenneth Henderson Jack married Alfreda Hughes, whom he had known since childhood, in 1942. They had two children: David Hughes born in 1944, and Stephen in 1950.

David Jack studied metallurgy at Cambridge, where he gained a PhD. He spent 1969–1970 as an ICI postdoctoral fellow in his father's research group at Newcastle, before being appointed Lecturer in the Metallurgy Department at Leeds University. In 1981 he took up a research manager position in Coventry with the Swedish industrial group Sandvik. From 1997 he worked for the Japanese machine tool company Yamazaki Mazak, retiring in 2009. He then oversaw which has its European HQ and factory in Worcester, UK, ultimately becoming responsible for its total European business. (Memoir) to retirement in 2009. He then presided over the opening of the company's new $17-million European Technology Centre in Worcester; it opened on 24 November 2009.

Freda Jack died suddenly in 1974 from a cerebral aneurysm. Kenneth developed health problems around 2007, and died in hospital on 28 January 2013. He was survived by his two sons.
