= Petrotest =

Petrotest GmbH, since 2013 Anton Paar ProveTec

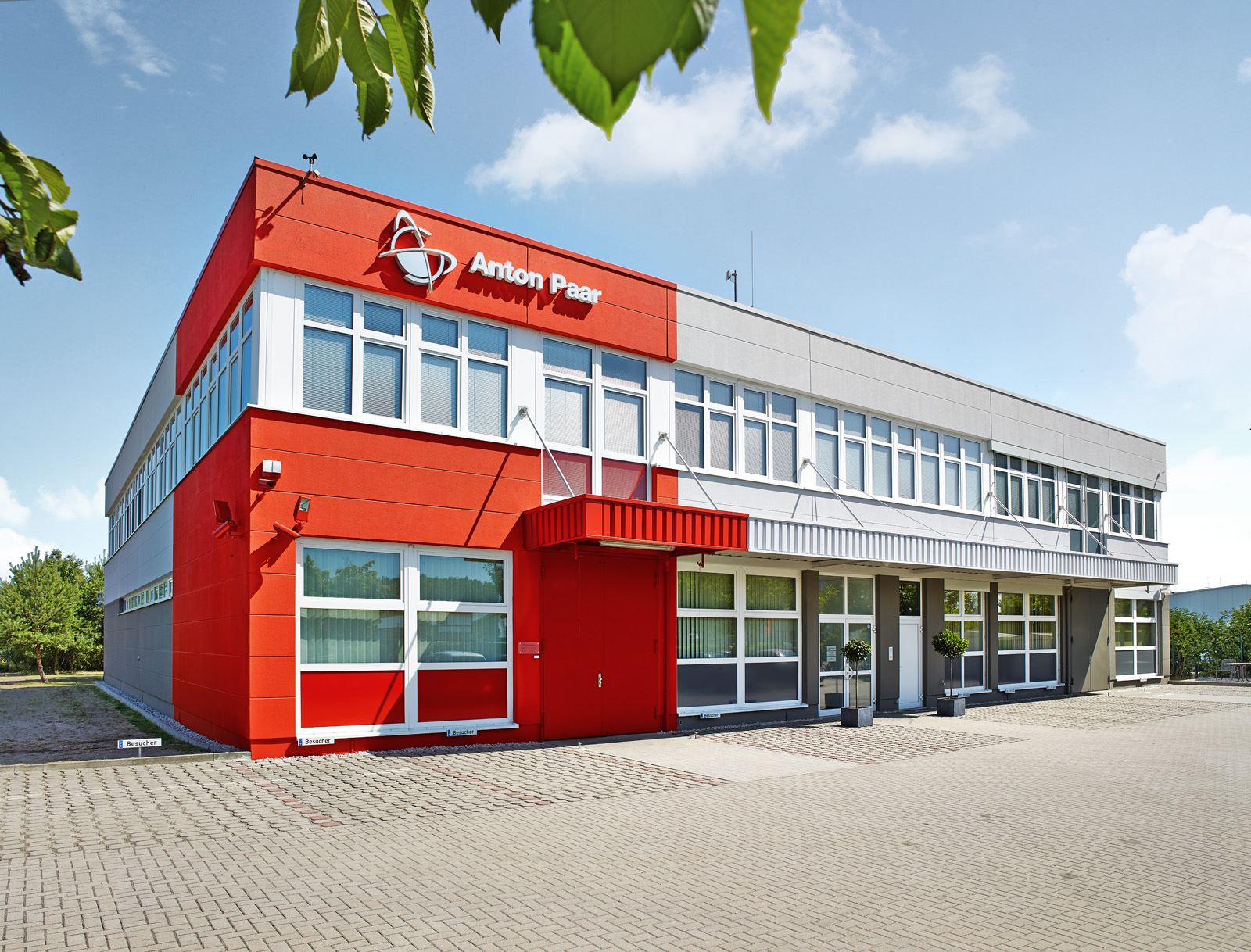
- Company type: GmbH
- Industry: Petroleum test equipment Laboratory test equipment
- Founded: Berlin, Germany (1873)
- Founder: Berthold Pensky
- Headquarters: Dahlewitz, Germany
- Area served: Worldwide
- Key people: Joerg Essmann (General Manager)
- Number of employees: 86
- Website: www.anton-paar.com

Anton Paar ProveTec, formerly known as Petrotest GmbH, is a German company within the Anton Paar group that is known for its laboratory equipment for the chemical and petrochemical industries. Furthermore, Anton Paar ProveTec is manufacturing measurement instruments for the cosmetics industry, the aroma and fragrance industry, the food, and pharmaceutical industry. The company was founded in 1873 by Berthold Pensky, who also invented the Pensky-Martens flash point tester. The company is ISO-9001 certified and located south of Berlin in Dahlewitz.

== History ==
=== Founding ===
After working at the former Kaiser Wilhelm Institute in Berlin-Dahlem, now Bundesanstalt für Materialforschung und -prüfung, Berthold Pensky started his own business manufacturing flash point testers, viscometers, grain testers and partial machinery. After a few years, he sold his Berlin-based company, then located at Wilhelmstrasse 122, to two of his employees, Wilhelm Sommer and Max Runge. They began operating under the name of Sommer & Runge, which was retained until the 1990s, with distribution markets at the time that included German Empire, the Netherlands, Russia and Romania. In 1914, Wilhelm Randow and Adolf Preukezas bought the company from Max Runge's widow; later, the company was acquired by Wilhelm Randow's children. During World War II mainly airplane parts were manufactured; the plant was partially destroyed in the bombing of Berlin and temporarily relocated to Dahme/Mark.

=== 1948 - 1978 ===
After 1948, the company was continued by Erwin Wierzbicki – a grandson of Wilhelm Randow – on the old premises and a manufacturing program of petroleum test equipment was specifically built up for the German-speaking market. The products at that time were mainly precision-engineered laboratory equipment, but some of the first electromechanical automatic flash point testers were also developed and manufactured.

=== 1979 - 2012 ===
Volkmar Wierzbicki took over the company Sommer & Runge on January 1, 1979 by purchasing it from his mother, subsequent to having already founded the company PETROTEST in 1975. The company Sommer & Runge was still a traditional company characterized by its highly skilled craftsmanship in the manufacture of laboratory test equipment for the petroleum industry. Sales were almost exclusively focused on Germany. The product range included about 100 different products, with predominantly made-to-order production; batches of five pieces tended to be the exception.

In June 1985, an English-language catalog was published for the first time, which has been continually reprinted and updated. Since the publication of the catalog, foreign sales rose to about 80% of total revenue and now include all of the oil-producing countries.

In mid-March 1989, after 85 years, the lease for the company premises on Bennigsenstrasse was terminated without conditions and the company moved to Berlin-Marienfelde. Effective January 1, 1992, the company changed its legal form: The companies Sommer & Runge KG, Petrotest, V. Wierzbicki, Berlin and Petrotest Laboratory Supplies, Hamburg were merged to form a new company, Petrotest Instruments GmbH & Co. KG. The over 100-year-old name Sommer & Runge had to be abandoned due to German commercial register regulations and the international recognition of the name Petrotest.

In 1996, the company set up operations for the first time in company-owned buildings to the south of Berlin in Dahlewitz. Since 2002, Florian Wierzbicki has worked at his father's company. At the end of February 2012 Volkmar Wierzbicki sold Petrotest Instruments GmbH & Co. KG to Austrian Anton Paar GmbH.

=== Since 2013 ===
As of July 2013 the company has been called Anton Paar ProveTec. Currently Joerg Essmann is the general manager.

== Products & Innovations ==
Anton Paar ProveTec produces flash point testers, distillation units, oxidation stability testers, instruments to determine the cold properties of fuels, penetrometers and other measuring instruments for the petroleum industry at its site in Dahlewitz. There are internationally standardized test methods for all of these products, which for the most part were developed in and around Berlin by scientists such as Engler, Ubbelohde, Martens and Pensky at the end of the 19th century. These processes have, among other things, been integrated into the standards of DIN, ASTM, IP and GOST. The devices manufactured today meet these standards, but are much easier for the user to operate due to the use of microprocessor technology.

=== Removable Head for Flash Point Testers ===
In 1996, the removable head for flash point testers was patented, thus giving the user the option to perform flash point tests with an automatic sample changer. This allows the user to accelerate the individual tests since the manual insertion, the required cooling and the manual removal of the sample container are no longer necessary. The sample changer option is no longer available. Along with the Pensky-Martens flash point tester, the company also manufactures TAG and Abel closed cup flash point testers and a Cleveland Open Cup flash point tester.

=== RSSOT - Rapid Small Scale Oxidation Tester - PetroOXY ===
Numerous test methods for determining the oxidation stability of fuels are known and available. Most of the test methods are outdated and require the user's considerable time and effort for the analytical work on the one hand, on the other very large quantities of fuel are needed, which represents a considerable safety risk. The results of these measurement methods are often very imprecise and can only be relied on with difficulty for assessing the stability of the fuels and the use thereof, such as in the automotive industry.

Therefore, in 2002 the development of a faster method of measurement was begun that uses a much smaller sample size with the aim of improving user safety and at the same time significantly improving accuracy. The development of this type of new measurement method was welcomed by the industry and proposed for an internationally valid standard measurement method. To this end, the measurement method had to be presented to the Technical Committees of standardization bodies such as ASTM International in the United States and accepted for the development of a new method. The procedure was published in 2009 by ASTM International and includes the methods for gasoline (ASTM D7525) and diesel, biodiesel and blends (ASTM D7545). A European standard for liquid petroleum products (EN 16091) was published in 2012 by CEN. The only device that currently functions according to these standards is the patented Rapid Small Scale Oxidation Tester (RSSOT) made by Anton Paar ProveTec. It is based on the Rapid Small Scale Oxidation Tester (RSSOT), which was manufactured and distributed by Petrotest under the name PetroOXY.

"The sole source of supply of the apparatus known to the committee at this time is PetroOXY apparatus, available from Petrotest Instruments GmbH & Co, Ludwig-Erhard-Ring 13, 15827 Dahlewitz, Germany."

— ASTM International; ASTM Committee D02 on Petroleum Products and Lubricants; Subcommittee D02.14 on Stability and Cleanliness of Liquid Fuels,
ASTM D7545 - 09 Standard Test Method for Oxidation Stability of Middle Distillate Fuels—Rapid Small Scale Oxidation Test (RSSOT), 2009, page 1, footnote 3 and
ASTM D7525 - 09 Standard Test Method for Oxidation Stability of Spark Ignition Fuel—Rapid Small Scale Oxidation Test (RSSOT), 2009, page 1, footnote 4

For the development of this new measurement method, the company received recognition for outstanding innovative results at the "Business Innovation Award 2007" of the Potsdam Chamber of Commerce and Industry.
