= Oncești =

Oncești may refer to several places in Romania:

- Oncești, Bacău, a commune in Bacău County, and its village of Onceștii Vechi
- Oncești, Maramureș, a commune in Maramureș County
- Oncești, a village in Mogoș Commune, Alba County
- Oncești, a village in Voinești Commune, Dâmbovița County
- Oncești, a village in Stănești Commune, Giurgiu County
