= Unified scattering function =

The unified scattering function was proposed in 1995 as a universal approach to describe small-angle X-ray, and neutron scattering (and in some cases light scattering) from disordered systems that display hierarchical structure.

== Concept ==
The concept of universal descriptions of scattering, that is scattering functions that do not depend on a specific structural model, but whose parameters can be related back to specific structures, have existed since about 1950. The prominent examples of universal scattering functions are Guinier's Law,

$I(q)=G\exp\left ( \frac{-q^2R_g^2}{3} \right )$	1

and Porod's Law,

$I(q)=Bq^{-4}$	2

where G, R_{g}, and B are constants related to the scattering contrast, structural volume, surface area, and radius of gyration. q is the magnitude of the scattering vector which is related to the Bragg spacing, d, q = 2π/d = 4π/λ sin(θ/2). λ is the wavelength and θ is the scattering angle (2θ in diffraction).

Both Guinier's Law and Porod's Law refer to an aspect of a single structural level. A structural level is composed of a size that can be expressed in R_{g}, and a structure as reflected in a power-law decay, -4 in the case of Porod's Law for solid objects with smooth, sharp interfaces. For other structures the power-law decay yields the mass-fractal dimension, d_{f}, which relates the mass and size of the object, thereby partially defining the object. For instance, a rod has d_{f} = 1 and a disk has d_{f} = 2. The prefactor to the power-law yields other details of the structure such as the surface to volume ratio for solid objects, the branch content for chain structures, the convolution or crumpled-ness of various objects. The prefactor to Guinier's Law yields the mass and volume fraction under dilute conditions. Above the overlap concentration (generally 1 to 5 volume percent) structural screening must be considered.

In addition to these universal functions that describe only a part of a structural level, a number of scattering functions that can describe a single structural level have been proposed for some disordered systems, most interestingly Debye's scattering function for a Gaussian polymer chain derived during World War II,

$I(q)=G\left ( \frac{\exp\left ( -x \right )+x-1}{x^2} \right )$	3

where x = q^{2}R_{g}^{2}. Eq. 3 reverts to Eq. 1 at low-q and to a power-law, I(q) = Bq^{−2} at high-q reflecting the two dimensional nature of a random walk or a diffusion path. Eq. 3 refers to a single structural level, corresponding to a Guinier regime and a power-law regime. The Guinier regime reflecting the overall size of the object without reference to the internal or surface structure of the object and the power-law reflecting the details of the structure, in this case a linear (unbranched), mass-fractal object with mass-fractal dimension, d_{f} = 2 (connectivity dimension of 1 reflecting a linear structure; and minimum dimension of 2 indicating a random conformation in 3d space).

In the 1990s it became apparent that single structural level functions similar to Eq. 3 would be of great use in describing complex, disordered structures such as branched mass-fractal aggregates, linear polymers in good solvents (d_{f} ~ 5/3), branched polymers (d_{f} > 2), cyclic polymers, and macromolecules of complex topology such as star, dendrimer, and comb polymers, as well as polyelectrolytes, micellar and colloidal materials such as worm-like micelles. Further, no analytically derived scattering functions could describe multiple structural levels in hierarchical materials. The observation of multiple structural levels is extremely common even in the case of a simple linear Gaussian polymer chain describe by Eq. 3 which is statistically composed of rod-like Kuhn units (level 1) which follow I(q) = Bq^{−1} at the highest-q. Common examples of hierarchical materials are silica, titania, and carbon black nano-aggregates composed of solid primary particles (level 1) displaying Porod scattering at highest q, Eq. 2, which aggregate into fairly rigid mass-fractal structures at intermediate nanoscales (level 2), and which agglomerate into micron-scale solid or network structures (level 3). Since these structural levels overlap in a small-angle scattering pattern, it was not possible to accurately model these materials using Eq. 1 and various power-law functions such as Eq. 2. For these reasons, a global scattering function that could be expanded to multiple structural levels was of interest.

In 1995 Beaucage derived the Unified Scattering Function,

$I(q)=\textstyle \sum_{i=1}^N \left ( G_i\exp\left( \frac{-q^2R_{g,i}^2}{3} \right)+\exp\left( \frac{-q^2R_{g,i+1}^2}{3} \right)B_iq_i^{*-P_i} \right )\displaystyle$	4

where "i" refers to the structural level starting with the smallest size, highest q. q_{i}^{*} is defined by,

$q_i^*=\frac{q}{erf\left(\frac{kqR_{g,i}}{\surd6}\right)^3}$	5

and k has a value of 1 for solid structural levels (:$3<P_i$) and approximately 1.06 for mass-fractal structural levels (:$3>P_i$). Eq. 4 recognizes that all structures display the behavior of Eq. 1 at largest sizes, that is all structures exhibit a size, and if the structure is randomly arranged that size manifests as a Gaussian function in small-angle scattering governed by the radius of gyration with larger objects displaying a smaller standard deviation, or larger R_{g}. At high-q Eq. 1 fails to describe the structure because it reflects an object with no surface or internal structure [8]. The second term in Eq. 4 gives the missing information concerning the surface or internal structure of the object by way of the power P_{i} and the prefactor B_{i} (as well as how P_{i} and B_{i} relate to G_{i}, and R_{g,i}). Beaucage realized that the problem of obtaining a generic multi-level scattering function lay in Eq. 2 since a power-law could not extend infinitely to low-q and yield a finite intensity at q => 0. Also, such a function would over power Eq. 1 in the range of q where Eq. 1 is appropriate.

Reference provides one of several possible derivations of Eq. 4, using Eq. 2 as an example of a power-law regime. A vector, r, can be visualized as the vector connecting interference points between an incident beam and the scattered beam. r = 2π/q where q = 4π/(λ sin θ/2) is the scattering vector in inverse space. Scattering occurs when two fringe points separated by r contain scattering material. If material is located at |r|/2 destructive interference occurs. So within a solid object there is always material at a position |r|/2 that negates scattering form material separated at |r|. Only at the surface do conditions of contrast occur.

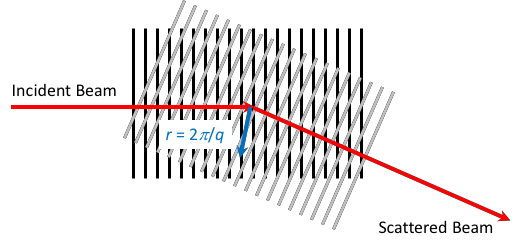
Figure 1. Origin of the vector r = 2π/q.

Eq. 2 describes scattering from a smooth sharp interface which results in scattering that is proportional to the surface area and decays with q^{−4}. The volume of a scattering element in this case scales with V ~ r^{3}. Scattering involves binary interference so is proportional to (ρV)^{2} ~ r^{6}. The number of these V domains is proportional to the surface area divided by the area of a domain, N ~ S/r^{2}. So the scattering intensity follows I(q) ~ SV^{2}/r^{2} ~ Sr^{4} ~ Sq^{−4}.

At small size scales, at high q, for an oddly shaped object with a smooth/sharp interface, the structure appears to be a flat surface and the described approach is appropriate. As the size scale of observation, r, approaches R_{g} at low q this model fails because the surface is no longer planar. That is, the scattering even in figure 1 relies on both ends of the vector, r, being coplanar and arranged as indicated (the specular condition) with respect to the incident and scattered beams. In the absence of this orientation no scattering occurs. The curvature of the particle, which is related to the radius of gyration, extinguishes surface scattering at low-q in the Guinier regime. Incorporating this observation in Porod's law in the original derivation is not possible since it relies on a Fourier transform of a correlation function for surface scattering. Beaucage arrived at Eq. 4 through a new derivation of Eq. 1 based on randomly placed particles and adoption of this approach to modification of Eq. 2.

== Beaucage derivation of Guinier's Law ==
Consider a randomly placed vector r such that both ends of the vector are in the particle. If the vector were held constant in space, while the particle were translated and rotated to any position meeting this condition and an average of the structures were taken, any object would result in a Gaussian mass distribution that would display a Gaussian correlation function,

$\gamma \left ( r \right )=\exp\left(-3r^2/4R_g^2\right)$	6

and would appear as an average cloud with no surface. The Fourier transform of Eq. 6 results in Eq. 1.

=== Limitations to power-law scattering at low-q ===
Power-law scattering is restricted to sizes smaller than the object. For example, within a mass-fractal object such as a polymer chain described by Eq. 3 the normalized mass of the chain, z, scales with the normalized size, R ~ R_{eted}/l_{k}, with a scaling power of the mass-fractal dimension, d_{f}, z ~ R^{d}^{f}. Considering scattering elements of size r, the number of such elements in a particle scales with N ~ z/r^{d}^{f}, and the mass of such a particle n ~ r^{d}^{f}, so the scattering is proportional to Nn^{2} or r^{d}^{f} ~ q^{-df}. At low-q the vector r ~ 1/q approaches the size of the particle. For this reason the power-law regime ends at low-q. One way to consider this is to think of the vector r_{a} beginning and ending in the particle, Figure 2 (a). This vector meets the mass fractal condition if the particle is a mass-fractal. In Figure 2 (b) the vector r_{b} separating two points, does not meet the mass-fractal condition, but with a translation of the particle by d the mass fractal condition can be met for bothe ends of r_{b}, (c).

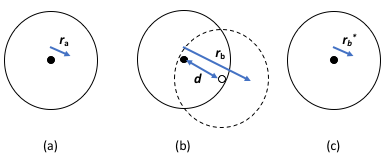
Figure 2. A particle with center of mass at the solid dot. (a) ra connects two points that meet the mass-fractal scattering condition. (b) rb connects two points that do not meet the mass-fractal condition. (c) rb* = rb -d = ra meets the condition.

In scattering we are considering all possible translations of the particle relative to one end of the vector r being located within the mass-fractal particle. The probability of moving the particle to meet the mass-fractal condition for both ends of the vector is less than 1 if r is close to the particle size. If the particle were of infinite size this probability would always be 1. For a finite particle Figure 2 shows that the reduction in probability for a scattering event at large sizes can be viewed as a reduction in the length of the vector r. This is the basis of the Unified Function. Rather than directly determining the scattering function, the reduction in r related to this translation is calculated. Since r is related to 2π/q we consider an effective increase in scattering vector q to q*. The relationship between q and q* is determined by first considering the consequence of the translation in Figure 2 on the correlation function based on the Gaussian derivation of Guinier's Law [8]. This analysis results in a modifying factor of,

$p\left ( q,R_g \right )=\left ( \frac{erf\left(qR_g\right)}{\surd6} \right )^3$	7

Following the Debye relationship, this factor can be incorporated into q yielding the transform,

$|F^2\left(q\right)|=V_p\rho_e^2\int_{0}^{inf} \gamma\left(r\right)\left(sin\left(qr\right)/q^*r\right)4\pi r^2dr$	8

where,

$q^*=\frac{q}{\left ( \frac{erf\left(qR_g\right)}{\surd6} \right )^3}$	9

as shown in Figure 2 in terms of q* = 2π/r*. References and demonstrates that for strong power-law decays Eq. 8 is equivalent to,

$|F^2\left(q\right)|=V_p\rho_e^2\int_{0}^{inf} \gamma\left(r\right)\left(sin\left(q^*r\right)/q^*r\right)4\pi r^2dr$	10

which allows for the direct use of a modification of Eq. 2 as,

$I(q)=B\left(q^*\right)^{-4}$	11

For mass-fractal power-laws this approximation is not perfect due to the shape of the correlation function at low-q as described in. A good approximation is to include a constant k whose value is about 1.06 for d_{f} = 2, so that Eq. 9 is replaced by,

$q^*=\frac{q}{\left ( \frac{erf\left(kqR_g\right)}{\surd6} \right )^3}$	12

In general for mass fractals it is found that k ~ 1.06 is a good approximation and k = 1 for surface fractal scattering.

With this modification, power-law scattering is compatible with Guinier scattering and the two terms can be summed in a Unified Equation,

$I(q)=G\exp\left ( -q^2R_g^2 \right )+B\left(q^*\right)^{-P}$	13

Eq. 13 can describe a single structural level and can closely replicate Eq. 3, equations for polydisperse spheres, rods, sheets, good solvent polymers, branched polymers, cyclic polymers, as demonstrated in and related publications. A wide range of disordered materials including mass and surface fractal structures can therefore be described using the Unified Approach.

For hierarchical materials with multiple structural levels Eq. 13 can be extended using a Gaussian cutoff at high-q for the power-law function which is common to equations for rods, disks and other simple scattering functions such as described in Guinier and Fournet,

$I(q)=\textstyle \sum_{i=1}^N \left (G_i\exp\left ( \frac{-q^2R_{g,i}^2}{3} \right )+\exp\left ( \frac{-q^2R_{g,i-1}^2}{3} \right )B_i\left(q_i^*\right)^{-P_i}\right )$	14

where it is taken that R_{g,0} = 0. This function has been used to describe persistence in polymer chains in good and theta solvents, branched polymers, polymers of complex topology such as star polymers, mass fractal primary particles/aggregates/agglomerates, rod diameter/length, disk thickness/width and other complex hierarchical structures. The lead cutoff term in Eq. 14 assumes that the structural level i is composed of structural levels i-1. If this is not true, a free parameter can substitute for R_{g,i-1} as described in.

Eq. 14 is quite flexible and it has been extended as a Hybrid Unified Function for micellar systems where the local structure is a perfect cylinder or other structure.

== Implementation of Unified Function ==
Jan Ilavsky of Argonne National Laboratory's Advanced Photon Source (USA) has provided open user code to perform fits using the Unified Function in the Igor Pro programing environment including video tutorials and an instruction manual.
