= Bârsana =

- Commune
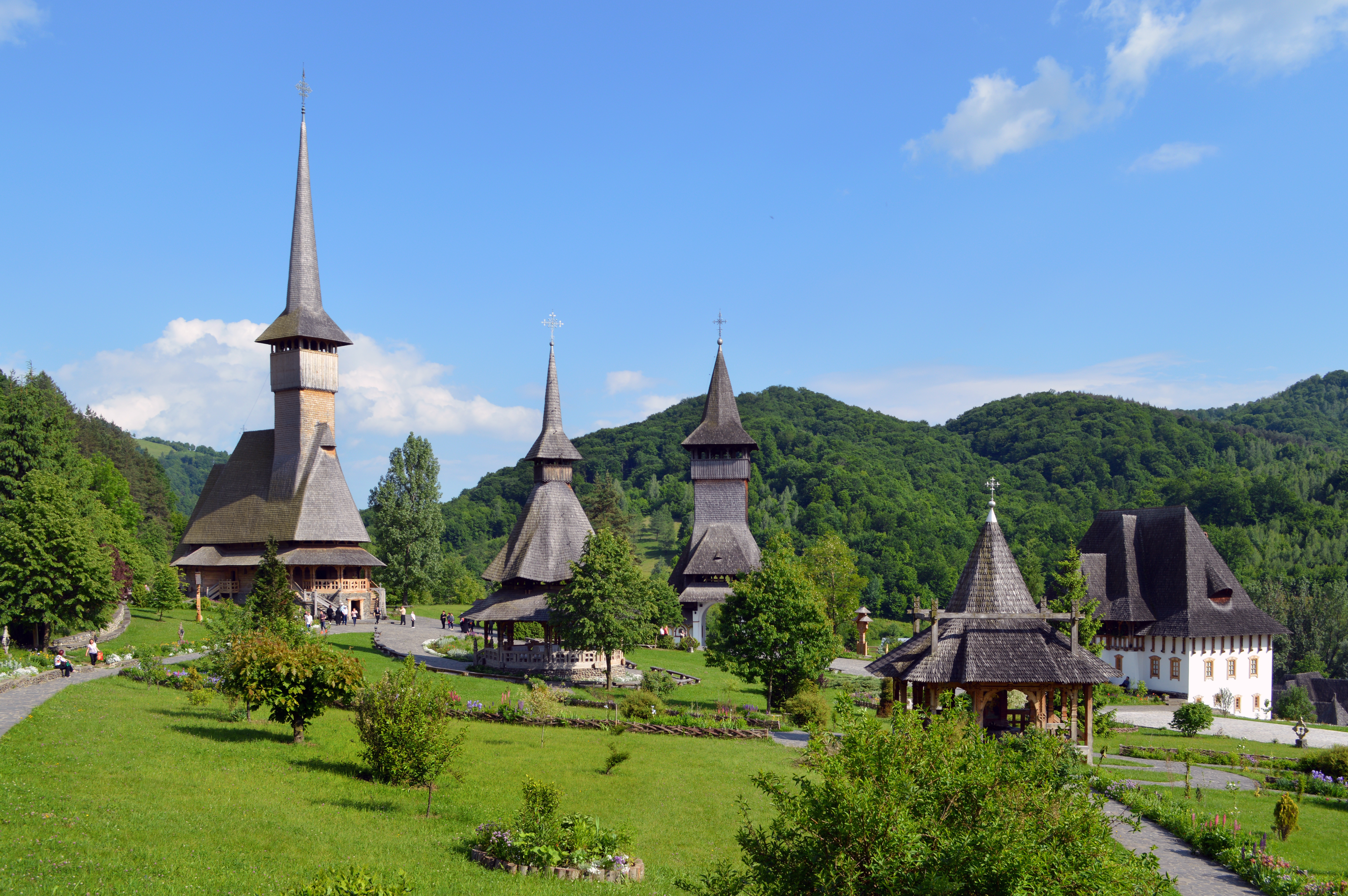
- Bârsana Monastery

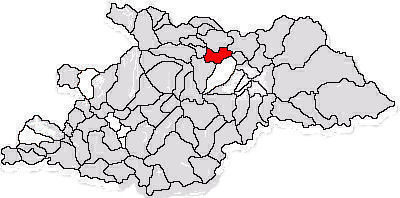
- Location in Maramureș County

- Location in Romania
- Coordinates: 47°48′54″N 24°03′35″E
- Country: Romania
- County: Maramureș
- Subdivisions: Bârsana, Nănești

Government
  - Mayor (2020–2024): Teodor Ștefanca (CMM)
- Area: 68.73 km^{2} (26.54 sq mi)
- Elevation: 310 m (1,020 ft)
- Population (2021-12-01): 4,122
  - Density: 59.97/km^{2} (155.3/sq mi)
- Time zone: UTC+02:00 (EET)
  - Summer (DST): UTC+03:00 (EEST)
- Postal code: 437035 - Bârsana; 437036 - Nănești
- Area code: (+40) 02 62
- Vehicle reg.: MM
- Website: primaria-birsana.ro

Bârsana (Hungarian: Barcánfalva or Barczanfalu, Yiddish: בירסאניף, romanized: Birsanif) is a commune in Maramureș County, Maramureș, Romania. It is composed of two villages, Bârsana and Nănești (Nánfalva, Yiddish: נאנעשט, romanized: Nanest). It also included the village of Oncești until 2004, when it was split off to form a separate commune.

== Geography ==
The commune is located in the northern part of Maramureș County, 20 km (12 mi) southeast of Sighetu Marmației and 58 km (36 mi) northeast of the county seat, Baia Mare. It is situated at an altitude of 310 m (1,020 ft) and lies on the banks of the Iza River and its left tributaries, the rivers Valea Morii and Văleni.

== Demographics ==
Historical population
Year	Pop.	±%
1880	4,070	—
1900	5,090	+25.1%
1910	5,602	+10.1%
1930	5,854	+4.5%
1956	6,490	+10.9%
1977	6,773	+4.4%
1992	6,968	+2.9%
2002	6,352	−8.8%
2011	4,474	−29.6%
2021	4,122	−7.9%
Source: Census data

At the 2002 census, Bârsana had 6,352 inhabitants, all but ten of whom were ethnic Romanians; moreover, 86.7% were Romanian Orthodox, 7.8% Greek-Catholic, and 3.1% Pentecostal. At the 2011 census, the population had decreased to 4,474, of whom 96.7% were Romanians. At the 2021 census, the commune had a population of 4,122, of whom 90% were Romanians.

== Churches ==
Bârsana's Church of the Presentation of the Virgin in the Temple is one of eight Wooden churches of Maramureș listed as a UNESCO World Heritage Site. After the Romanian Revolution of 1989, another wooden monastery was built in Bârsana. The French physicist Yvette Cauchois is buried at Bârsana Monastery.
