= Văleni (Iza) =

- Location within Romania

Location
- Country: Romania
- Counties: Maramureș County
- Villages: Văleni

Physical characteristics
- Mouth: Iza
  - location: Bârsana
  - coordinates: 47.8192°N 24.0438°E
- Length: 10 km (6.2 mi)
- Basin size: 20 km^{2} (7.7 sq mi)

Basin features
- Progression: Iza→ Tisza→ Danube→ Black Sea

The Văleni is a left tributary of the river Iza in Romania. It discharges into the Iza near Bârsana. Its length is 10 km (6.2 mi) and its basin size is 20 km^{2} (7.7 sq mi).
