= Hellmut Fischmeister =

Austrian metallurgist (1927–2019)

- Born: 14 May 1927; Vienna, Austria
- Died: 6 November 2019 (aged 92); Graz, Austria
- Education: University of Graz
- Known for: powder metallurgy
- Scientific career
- Institutions: LM Ericsson; Institute for Metals Research (Sweden); Uppsala University; Stora Kopparbergs Bergslags AB; Chalmers University of Technology; University of Leoben; MPI for Intelligent Systems; MPI of Microstructure Physics
- Doctoral advisor: Otto Kratky
- Doctoral students: Eduard Arzt

Hellmut Friedrich Fischmeister (14 May 1927 – 6 November 2019) was an Austrian metallurgist who was a pioneer in powder metallurgy.

== Education and career ==
Fischmeister studied physics, mathematics, and chemistry at the University of Graz from 1945 to 1951 and received his doctorate in physical chemistry with Otto Kratky in 1951. From 1953, he was a research assistant at the Institute of Inorganic Chemistry at Uppsala University. In 1956, he became head of the Physics and Materials groups at the Development Laboratory of LM Ericsson in Stockholm. From 1958, he led the Laboratory of Powder Metallurgy at the Swedish Institute for Metals Research (Institutet för Metallforskning) in Stockholm. In 1961, he qualified as a university lecturer at Uppsala University in the field of general and inorganic chemistry. From 1961, he headed the research department for cemented carbides at the stainless steel works of Stora Kopparbergs Bergslags AB in Söderfors, subsequently leading the entire research, development, and quality assurance of the stainless steel works in Söderfors (today Erasteel Kloster AB and Alleima Söderfors).

In 1965, Fischmeister accepted a call to the chair and head of the Institute of Metallic Materials at Chalmers University of Technology in Gothenburg. In 1975, he was appointed chair and head of the Institute of Metallurgy and Materials Testing at the University of Leoben. In 1981, he became a scientific member of the Max Planck Society and director of the Institute of Materials Sciences at the Max Planck Institute for Metals Research in Stuttgart (now the Max Planck Institute for Intelligent Systems). In addition to his leadership role at the Max Planck Institute for Metals Research, he was also the founding director of the Max Planck Institute of Microstructure Physics in Halle (Saale) from 1991 to 1993. In 1995, he retired from the Max Planck Institute for Metals Research. Fischmeister was a member of the Austrian Universities' Board of Trustees (Universitätenkuratorium) from 1993 till 2003 and was a member of the Austrian Science Council (Wissenschaftsrat) from 2004 to 2009.

== Honors and awards ==
Hellmut Fischmeister was elected as a foreign member of the Royal Swedish Academy of Engineering Sciences in 1975. In 1981, he was elected as a corresponding member of the Austrian Academy of Sciences and was a member of the Academia Europaea since 1989. In 1995, he became a full member of the mathematical-natural sciences class of the Austrian Academy of Sciences.

- 1969: Knight of the Royal Order of the North Star
- 1991: Honorary doctorate from KTH Royal Institute of Technology in Stockholm
- 1992: Honorary doctorate from Graz University of Technology
- 1997: Order of Merit of the Federal Republic of Germany, Cross of Merit 1st Class
- 2007: Honorary doctorate from the University of Leoben
- 2010: Austrian Cross of Honour for Science and Art, 1st class
- 2010: Honorary member of the German Materials Society (Deutsche Gesellschaft für Materialkunde)
