= Charles-Victor Mauguin =

French scientist

- Born: 19 September 1878; Provins, France
- Died: 25 April 1958 (aged 79); Villejuif, France
- Citizenship: French
- Education: École normale supérieure de Saint-Cloud; École normale supérieure, Paris
- Known for: Hermann–Mauguin notation
- Scientific career
- Fields: Mineralogy, crystallography
- Workplaces: University of Bordeaux; University of Nancy; University of Paris
- Thesis: Les amides bromées-sodées et leur rôle dans la transposition d'Hofmann (1910)
- Doctoral students: André Guinier

Charles-Victor Mauguin (French: [ʃaʁl.vik.tɔʁ mo.gɛ̃]; 19 September 1878 – 25 April 1958), more often Charles Mauguin, was a French mineralogist and crystallographer. He and Carl Hermann invented an international standard notation for crystallographic groups called Hermann–Mauguin notation (also sometimes called international notation).

== Education and career ==
Mauguin originally intended to become a school teacher and enrolled at École normale supérieure de Saint-Cloud in 1902. Later he moved to École Normale Supérieure, Paris, where he obtained his Doctor of Science in 1910 in the field of organic chemistry. During his chemistry studies, he also attended lectures on mathematics offered at Sorbonne University, including those by Émile Picard, Henri Poincaré, Paul Painlevé, and Édouard Goursat. Before World War I, Mauguin was briefly a faculty member at University of Bordeaux in 1912 and at University of Nancy from 1913 to 1919. He moved back to University of Paris in 1919 and worked under Frédéric Wallerant as an associate professor of mineralogy. He took over the position in 1933 and became a professor of mineralogy at University of Paris and worked until 1948, when Mauguin retired.

Mauguin was the first to notice that when he sandwiched the semi-solid liquid crystals between two aligned polarizers, he could twist them in relation to each other, but the light continued to be transmitted. This phenomenon is called Mauguin regime (waveguide regime) in twisted nematic effect .
