= Lemonniera =

Scientific classification
- Kingdom: Fungi
- Division: Ascomycota
- Class: Leotiomycetes
- Order: Helotiales
- Family: Discinellaceae
- Genus: Lemonniera; De Wild.

Genus of fungi

Lemonniera is a genus of fungi belonging to the family Discinellaceae.

Lemonniera is a well known genus within the aquatic hyphomycetes. Many of these species grow on leaf litter in rivers and headwaters.

The genus has almost cosmopolitan distribution.

The genus name of Lemonniera is in honour of Georges Le Monnier (1843–1931), who was a French scientist.

The genus was circumscribed by Émile Auguste Joseph De Wildeman in Ann. Soc. Belge Microscop. vol.18 on page 147 in 1894.

Species:

- Lemonniera alabamensis R.C.Sinclair & Morgan-Jones
- Lemonniera aquatica De Wild.
- Lemonniera centrosphaera Marvanová
- Lemonniera cornuta Ranzoni
- Lemonniera filiformis R.H.Petersen
- Lemonniera filiformis R.H.Petersen ex Dyko
- Lemonniera pseudofloscula Dyko
- Lemonniera terrestris Tubaki
- Lemonniera yulongensis Z.F.Yu
