= George Dawson Preston =

British physicist (1896–1972)

George Dawson Preston FRSE (8 August 1896 – 22 June 1972) was a 20th century British physicist specialising in crystallography and the structure of alloys. He was one of the first to use x-rays and electron diffraction to study the crystal structure of metals and alloys. Along with André Guinier, Preston gives his name to the Guinier-Preston zone, discovered in 1938.

== Life ==
He was born in the village of Rathgar slightly south of Dublin on 8 August 1896 the eldest son of Prof Thomas Preston FRS, and the college head, Katherine Mary (born McEwen). His father died when George was only four years old. He was educated at Oundle School in Northamptonshire.

In the First World War he served in the Princess of Wales' Own Regiment and was wounded in the leg.

He studied natural sciences at Gonville and Caius College, Cambridge, graduating MA then gaining a postgraduate doctorate (DSc) in 1921. He found immediate employment in the Metallurgy Division of the National Physical Laboratory. He stayed there until 1943 when he replaced William Peddie as Professor of Physics at University College, Dundee.

He was elected a Fellow of the Royal Society of Edinburgh in 1944. His proposers were Edward Thomas Copson, Charles Alfred Coulson, Robert Campbell Garry and Alexander David Peacock.

He died in Meigle, Perthshire on 22 June 1972.

== Family ==
In 1923 he married Margaret Chrystal.

They were parents of George Dawson Chrystal Preston (b.1931).
