= Porod's law =

In X-ray or neutron small-angle scattering (SAS), Porod's law, discovered by Günther Porod, describes the asymptote of the scattering intensity I(q) for large scattering wavenumbers q.

== Context ==
Porod's law is concerned with wave numbers q that are small compared to the scale of usual Bragg diffraction; typically $q\lesssim1\text{ nm}^{-1}$. In this range, the sample must not be described at an atomistic level; one rather uses a continuum description in terms of an electron density or a neutron scattering length density. In a system composed of distinct mesoscopic particles, all small-angle scattering can be understood as arising from surfaces or interfaces. Normally, SAS is measured in order to detect correlations between different interfaces, and in particular, between remote surface segments of one and the same particle. This allows conclusions about the size and shape of the particles, and their correlations.

Porod's q is relatively large on the usual scale of SAS. In this regime, correlations between remote surface segments and inter-particle correlations are so random that they average out. Therefore one sees only the local interface roughness.

== Standard form ==
If the interface is flat, then Porod's law predicts the scattering intensity

$$I(q) \sim Sq^{-4}$$

where S is the surface area of the particles, which can in this way be experimentally determined. The power law q^{−4} corresponds to the factor 1/sin^{4}θ in Fresnel equations of reflection. (Note: This has been pointed out by Sinha et al.)

== Generalized form ==
Since the advent of fractal mathematics it has become clear that Porod's law requires adaptation for rough interfaces because the value of the surface S may be a function of q (the yardstick by which it is measured). In the case of a fractally rough surface area with a dimensionality d between 2-3 Porod's law becomes:

$$\lim_{q \rightarrow \infty} I(q) \propto S' q^{-(6-d)}$$

Thus if plotted logarithmically the slope of ln(I) versus ln(q) would vary between -4 and -3 for such a surface fractal. Slopes less negative than -3 are also possible in fractal theory and they are described using a volume fractal model in which the whole system can be described to be self-similar mathematically although not usually in reality in the nature.

== Derivation ==
=== as Form factor asymptote ===
For a specific model system, e.g. a dispersion of uncorrelated spherical particles, one can derive Porod's law by computing the scattering function S(q) exactly, averaging over slightly different particle radii, and taking the limit $q \to \infty$.

=== by considering just an interface ===
Alternatively, one can express S(q) as a double surface integral, using Ostrogradsky's theorem. For a flat surface in the xy-plane, one obtains (Note: Sinha et al., Eq. (2.12).)

$$S(\vec{q})=\frac{4\pi^2}{q_z^2}\delta(q_x)\delta(q_y).$$

Taking the spherical average over possible directions of the vector q, one obtains Porod's law in the form (Note: Sinha et al., Eq. (3.3))

$$S(q)=\frac{2\pi}{q^4}.$$
