= Yvette Cauchois =

French physicist (1908–1999)

Professor Yvette Cauchois
- Born: 19 December 1908; Francueil, Indre-et-Loire, France
- Died: 19 November 1999 (aged 90); Paris, France
- Resting place: Monastery at Bârsana, Romania
- Education: Sorbonne
- Awards: Ancel Prize from the Société chimique de France (1933); Officer of the Legion of Honour; Officers of the Order of Merit; Gold medal of the University of Paris
- Scientific career
- Fields: X-ray spectroscopy X-ray optics
- Workplaces: CNRS; National Laboratories of Frascati; Laboratory for the Use of Electromagnetic Radiation, Orsay University of Paris XI; Laboratory of Physical Chemistry, Sorbonne
- Thesis: Extension de la spectroscopie des rayons X. Spectrographe à focalisation par cristal courbé; spectre d'émission X des gaz (1934)

Signature
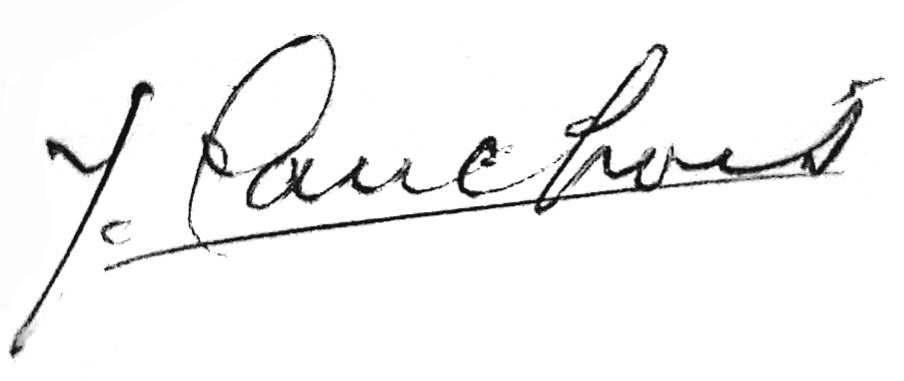

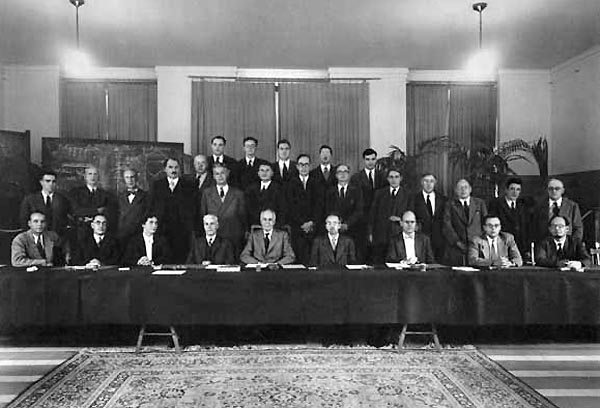
Solvay Conference on Physics in Brussels 1951; Cauchois is seated, third from left.

Yvette Cauchois (French pronunciation: [ivɛt koʃwa]; 19 December 1908 – 19 November 1999) was a French physicist and researcher at the French National Centre for Scientific Research (CNRS). She is known for her contributions to X-ray spectroscopy and X-ray optics, and for pioneering European synchrotron research.

== Life ==
=== Education ===
Cauchois attended school in Paris, and pursued undergraduate studies at the Sorbonne, who awarded her a degree in the physical sciences in July 1928. Cauchois undertook graduate studies at the Laboratory of Physical Chemistry with the support of a National Fund for Science studentship, and was awarded her doctorate in 1933 for her work on the use of curved crystals for high-resolution X-ray analysis.

=== Career ===
After completing her doctoral studies, Cauchois was appointed research assistant in the laboratory of Jean Perrin at the Centre national de la recherche scientifique (CNRS). She was promoted to research associate in 1937, and in the same year participated in the launch of the Palais de la Découverte.

In January 1938 Cauchois was named head of the Physical Chemistry Laboratory in the Faculty of Sciences of the University of Paris. When World War II broke out, Cauchois maintained continuity at the Laboratory, acting as Head of Studies when Jean Perrin had to flee to the United States. In 1945, when the Liberation of France led to the dismissal of Louis Dunoyer de Segonzac, Cauchois was promoted to Professor at the Sorbonne. She became Chair of Chemical Physics in 1954, succeeding Edmond Bauer to take charge of the laboratory.

With the number of researchers outgrowing the available space in the Laboratory, Cauchois founded the Centre de Chimie Physique at Orsay in 1960. She directed this organisation for ten years, whilst simultaneously continuing her work at the Sorbonne. She joined the University of Paris VI in 1971 following the division of the Sorbonne.

Cauchois chaired the French Society of Physical Chemistry from 1975–1978. She was only the second woman to do so, after Marie Curie. From 1978 until her retirement in 1983, Cauchois was Professor Emeritus at the University of Paris VI. Cauchois was still conducting active laboratory research as late as 1992 (aged 83). Over her lifetime she produced more than 200 publications, which continue to be cited today.

== Research ==
=== X-rays and crystals ===
In the early 1930s, Cauchois established the fundamental principles of a new X-ray spectrometer that was both easy to use and had a high resolution, satisfying the Bragg reflection condition. The new spectrometer was named after her, and from 1934 she used it to observe gas emissions and multiplets. The new technique was used around the world for the analysis of X-rays and gamma rays and prompted a wave of new scholarship in radiation studies. Cauchois pioneered developments in X-ray imaging and observed that X-ray radiation could be focused using curved crystal for use in monochromators and X-ray scattering. Cauchois' work on soft X-ray distributions was the first step in determining the photo-absorption spectra. She used the radiation reflected from crystals to study the electronic structure of materials.

Cauchois systematically studied the X-ray spectra of heavy elements and actinides. In 1936, Cauchois and Horia Hulubei claimed to have discovered element 85 via X-ray analysis, conducting further research and publishing on follow-up studies in 1939. With Frederick Kenneth McTaggart in 1948 she determined the differential absorption of X-rays by zirconium and hafnium. Cauchois, Sonia Cotelle, and Hulubei proved the presence of polonium and neptunium, and Cauchois later pioneered studies on the X-ray spectra of transuranic elements.

Since 1949, she published various papers with Nevill Mott including the theoretical understanding of the fine structure of X-ray absorption edges.

A fascination with astrophysics led Cauchois to study extraterrestrial X-ray radiation, especially the solar X-ray spectrum using missile experiments. In 1970 she produced X-ray images of the Sun.

=== Synchrotron and solar research ===
From 1962, Cauchois initiated a research programme in collaboration with the Istituto Superiore di Sanità at the Laboratori Nazionali di Frascati to explore the possibilities of synchrotron research. She was the first person in Europe to realise the potential of the radiation emitted by electrons rotating in the synchrotron as a source for understanding the properties of matter. In the early 1970s, Cauchois carried out her experiments at LURE (Laboratoire pour l'utilisation des radiations électromagnétiques).

== Personal life and death ==
Cauchois was particularly interested in assisting young and underprivileged people. She also enjoyed poetry and music, and was a grand piano player. After meeting a priest from the monastery of Bârsana in Maramureș, Romania and discussing religious themes with him, Cauchois decided to be baptized in the Orthodox religion at age 86. Cauchois contracted bronchitis on a trip to Romania, and died a few days after returning to Paris. She was buried at Bârsana Monastery, to whom she bequeathed her assets.

== Publications ==
=== Books ===
Cauchois and Hulubei published the Longeuers d'onde des emissions X et des discontinuités d'absorption X collecting various of their papers. It is a widely cited book, specially the papers on X-ray spectra of lead, gold, and thalium by Cauchois.

In 1948, Cauchois published Les spectres de rayons X et la structure électronique de la matière which was used as an advanced graduate physics textbook. Physicist Nevill Mott described it in the preface as the first book dedicated to the emission and X-ray spectra of solids. Lyman G. Parratt cited it as one of the first reviews on the history of experimental techniques on the topic. The book was contemporaneous to Léon Brillouin's Wave propagation in Periodic Media.

With Yvonne Heno, Cauchois published Cheminement de particules chargées (volume 1) in 1964, focused on synchroton radiation as a tool to study crystals.

== Awards ==
- Ancel Prize from the Société chimique de France (1933)
- Henri Becquerel Prize from the French Academy of Sciences (1935)
- Gizbal-Baral Prize (10,000 francs) from the French Academy of Sciences (1936)
- Henry de Jouvenel Prize for selfless scientific activity (10,000 francs) from the Ministry of National Education (France) (1938)
- Jerome Ponti Prize from the French Academy of Sciences (1942)
- Triossi Prize from the French Academy of Sciences (1946)
- Commander of the Order of the Ministry of Education
- Officer of the Legion of Honour
- Officer of the National Order of Merit (France)
- Medal of the Czechoslovak Society of Spectroscopy (1974)
- Fellow of The Optical Society (1974)
- Gold medal of the University of Paris (1987)
- Doctor honoris causa of the University of Bucharest (1993)
- Cauchois' name was given to a street of the new university area of Moulon in Gif-sur-Yvette and a street in Tomblaine (Meurthe-et-Moselle).

In 2026, Cauchois was announced as one of 72 historical women in STEM whose names have been proposed to be added to the 72 men already celebrated on the Eiffel Tower. The plan was announced by the Mayor of Paris, Anne Hidalgo following the recommendations of a committee led by Isabelle Vauglin of Femmes et Sciences and Jean-François Martins, representing the operating company which runs the Eiffel Tower.

== See also ==
- Women in physics
