= Guinier–Preston zone =

A Guinier–Preston zone, or GP-zone, is a fine-scale metallurgical phenomenon, involving early stage precipitation.

GP-zones are associated with the phenomenon of age hardening, whereby room-temperature reactions continue to occur within a material through time, resulting in changing physical properties. In particular, this occurs in several aluminium series, such as the 6000 and 7000 series alloys.

Physically, GP zones are extremely fine-scaled (on the order of 3–10 nm in size) solute enriched regions of the material, which offer physical obstructions to the motion of dislocations, above that of the solid solution strengthening of the solute components. In 7075 aluminium, for example, Zn–Mg clusters precede the formation of equilibrium MgZn_{2} precipitates.

The zone is named after André Guinier and George Dawson Preston who independently identified the zones in 1938.
