= Raimond Castaing =

French physicist (1921–1998)

Raimond Bernard René Castaing
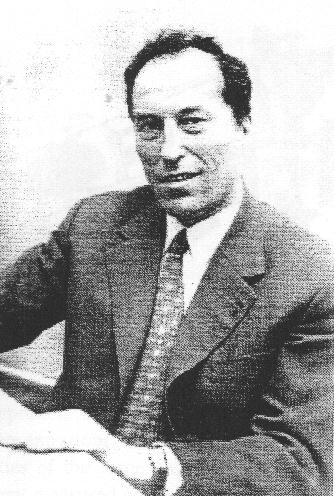
- Born: December 28, 1921; Monaco
- Died: April 10, 1998 (aged 76)
- Education: École normale supérieure University of Paris
- Scientific career
- Institutions: University of Toulouse; University of Paris; Paris-Sud University
- Thesis: Application of electron probes to local chemical and crystallographic analysis (1951)
- Doctoral advisor: André Guinier

Raimond Bernard René Castaing (December 28, 1921 – April 10, 1998), also spelt as Raymond Castaing, was a French solid state physicist and inventor of various materials characterization methods. He was the founder of the French school of microanalysis and is referred to as the father of microanalysis.

== Education and career ==
Castaing went to school in Monaco, Condom, and Toulouse. From 1940 he studied physics at the École Normale Supérieure in Paris (ENS) and at the University of Paris, interrupted by work service in 1943/44. He also attended lectures by Frédéric Joliot-Curie, who taught at the Collège de France, and courses by Alfred Kastler and others at the ENS. In 1946 he graduated from the ENS and from 1947 he was an engineer with the national space research organization ONERA. In 1951 he received his doctorate under the supervision of André Guinier, with the thesis titled Application des sondes électroniques à une méthode d'analyse ponctuelle chimique et cristallographique (Application of electron probes to local chemical and crystallographic analysis). He developed the microprobe named after him, which enabled material investigations in the micrometer range from the analysis of the X-ray spectra after electron bombardment (electron beam microanalysis, EPMA, Electron Probe Micro Analysis). In the late 1950s he was also involved in the development of secondary ion mass spectrometry (SIMS) (with his student Georges Slodzian). The first demonstration took place in 1960 and further development took place at the Cameca company and there was competition with the SIMS developed in the US by Richard Herzog and Helmut Liebl. In 1952, he became a lecturer (maître de conferences) at the University of Toulouse and from 1956 at the University of Paris. From 1959 he was a professor at the University of Paris-Sud in Orsay, where he founded the Laboratory for Solid State Physics with Jacques Friedel and others.

From 1968 to 1973 he was scientific director and later general director of ONERA. From 1982 he was on the French National Council for Reactor Safety Issues and from 1987 on the French National Committee for Nuclear Energy. In this capacity, he headed a state commission in 1996 that was to assess the Superphénix reactor. From 1984 to 1987 he was on the supervisory board of the French steel group Usinor.

== Honors and awards ==
In 1966 he received the Holweck Prize, in 1975 the CNRS Gold Medal and in 1977 the Roebling Medal of the Mineralogical Society of America. In 1968 he became a member of the German Academy of Natural Scientists Leopoldina. In 1977 he also became a member of the French Academy of Sciences.

== Bibliography ==
- Castaing, Raimond (1955). Connaissance de l'électronique (in French). Paris: Ed. du Tambourinaire. OCLC 27303155.
- Castaing, Raymond (1960-01-01), "Electron Probe Microanalysis", in Marton, L.; Marton, Claire (eds.), Advances in Electronics and Electron Physics Volume 13, vol. 13, Academic Press, pp. 317–386, doi:10.1016/s0065-2539(08)60212-7, ISBN 978-0-12-014513-3
- Philibert, J; Deschamps, P; Castaing, R (1966). Optique des rayons X et microanalyse = X-ray optics and microanalysis. Paris: Hermann. OCLC 421505244.
- Castaing, Raimond (1970). Cours de thermodynamique statistique (in French). Paris: Masson. OCLC 859839761.
- Maurice, Françoise; Meny, Lucienne; Tixier, Roland; Castaing, Raimond, eds. (1987). Microanalyse et microscopie électronique à balayage (in French). Les Ulis: Ed. de physique. OCLC 25183868.
