= Oncești, Maramureș =

Oncești
- Commune
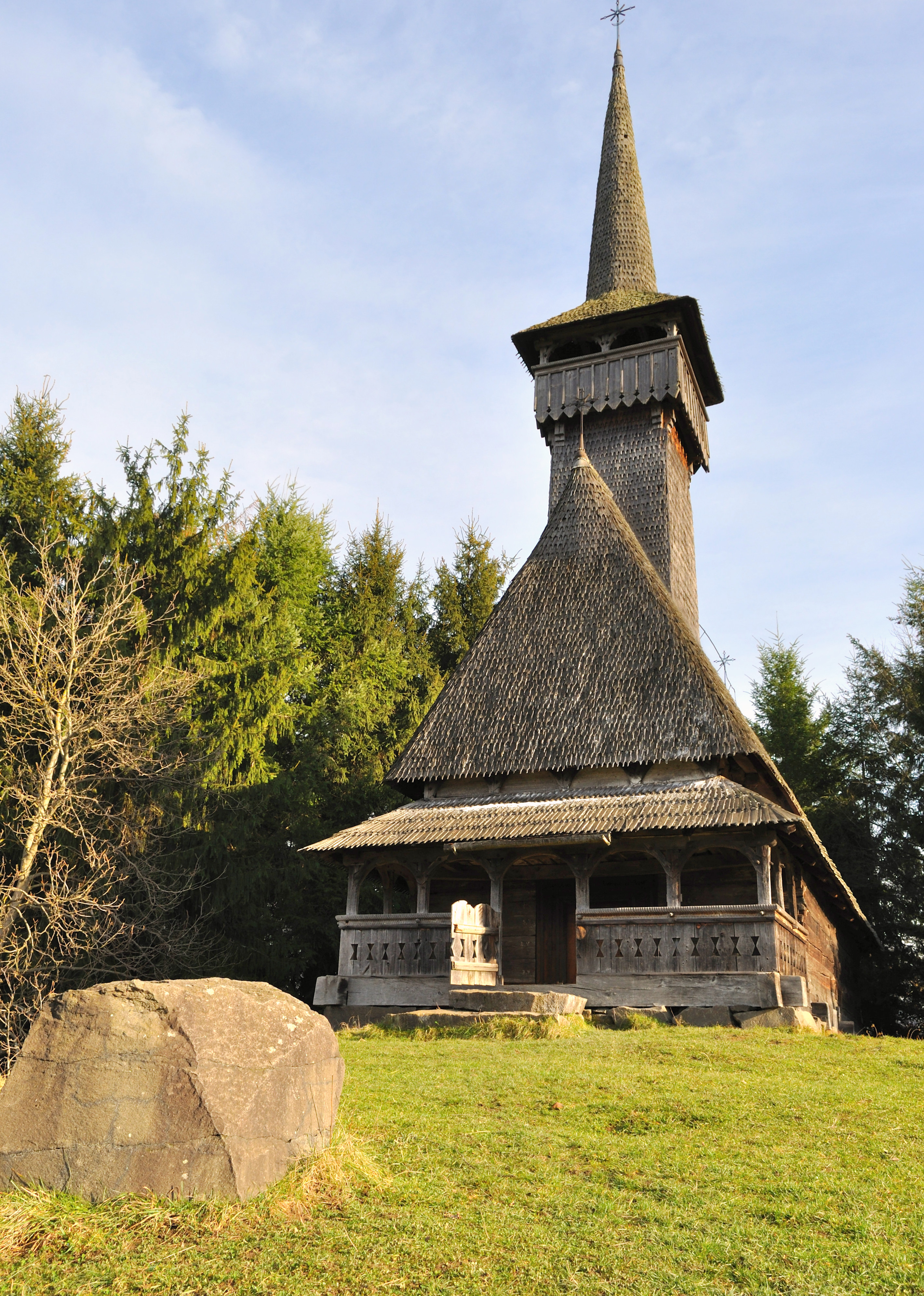
- Wooden church in Oncești

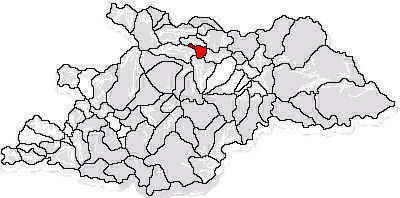
- Location in Maramureș County

- Location in Romania
- Coordinates: 47°50′50″N 23°58′45″E
- Country: Romania
- County: Maramureș

Government
  - Mayor (2020–2024): Matei Godja (Ind.)
- Area: 20.65 km^{2} (7.97 sq mi)
- Population (2021-12-01): 1,519
  - Density: 73.56/km^{2} (190.5/sq mi)
- Time zone: UTC+02:00 (EET)
  - Summer (DST): UTC+03:00 (EEST)
- Postal code: 437037
- Area code: (+40) 02 62
- Vehicle reg.: MM
- Website: primariaoncesti.ro

Oncești (Hungarian: Váncsfalva, Yiddish: אונצ'שט, romanized: Uncsest) is a commune in Maramureș County, Maramureș, Romania. It is composed of a single village, Oncești, which used to be part of Bârsana Commune until being split off in 2004.

Historical population
Year	Pop.	±%
1880	1,070	—
1900	1,365	+27.6%
1910	1,469	+7.6%
1930	1,475	+0.4%
1956	1,598	+8.3%
1977	1,628	+1.9%
1992	1,644	+1.0%
2002	1,549	−5.8%
2011	1,549	+0.0%
2021	1,519	−1.9%
Source: Census data
