= Otto Kratky =

Austrian physicist (1902 – 1995)

- Born: March 9, 1902; Vienna, Austria-Hungary
- Died: February 11, 1995 (aged 92); Graz, Austria
- Education: Technical University Vienna; Kaiser Wilhelm Institute
- Known for: small-angle X-ray scattering
- Scientific career
- Institutions: University of Vienna; Kaiser Wilhelm Institute; Czech Technical University in Prague; University of Graz
- Doctoral advisor: Reginald Oliver Herzog
- Other academic advisors: Herman Francis Mark
- Doctoral students: Günther Porod; Hellmut Fischmeister

Otto Kratky (German: [ˈɔtɔ ˈkʁatki]; born 9 March 1902 in Vienna – died 11 February 1995 in Graz) was an Austrian physicist. He is best known for his contribution to the small-angle X-ray scattering method, for the Kratky plot, and for the invention of the density metering using the oscillating u-tube principle. The worm-like chain model in polymer physics, introduced with Günther Porod in a 1949 paper, is also named the Kratky–Porod model.

== Education and career ==
Otto Kratky was born in Vienna as the son of the painter Rudolf Kratky. After graduating from high school, he studied chemistry at the Technical University Vienna and completed his studies in 1929 with a doctorate. After completing his university education, he became an assistant at the Kaiser Wilhelm Institute in Berlin-Dahlem in 1928, a position he held until 1933. He then worked as a university lecturer at the University of Vienna until he returned to the Institute for Physical Chemistry and Electrochemistry of the Kaiser Wilhelm Institute in Berlin in 1937 as the head of the X-ray department. From 1940 to 1943 he was a civil servant. He became a full professor at the Czech Technical University in Prague and from 1943 to 1945 head of the institute for physical chemistry there.

From 1946 to 1972, Kratky was a professor at the University of Graz Institute for Physical Chemistry. In 1956/57 he served as rector of the university.

== Honors and awards ==
In 1936, Kratky won the Haitinger Prize of the Austrian Academy of Sciences. In 1985 he was elected to the German order Pour le Mérite. Kratky was awarded the Erwin Schrödinger Prize by the Austrian Academy of Sciences in 1964, the Wilhelm Exner Medal in 1970, and the Gregori Aminoff Prize in 1987.
