= Georges Le Monnier =

French scientist

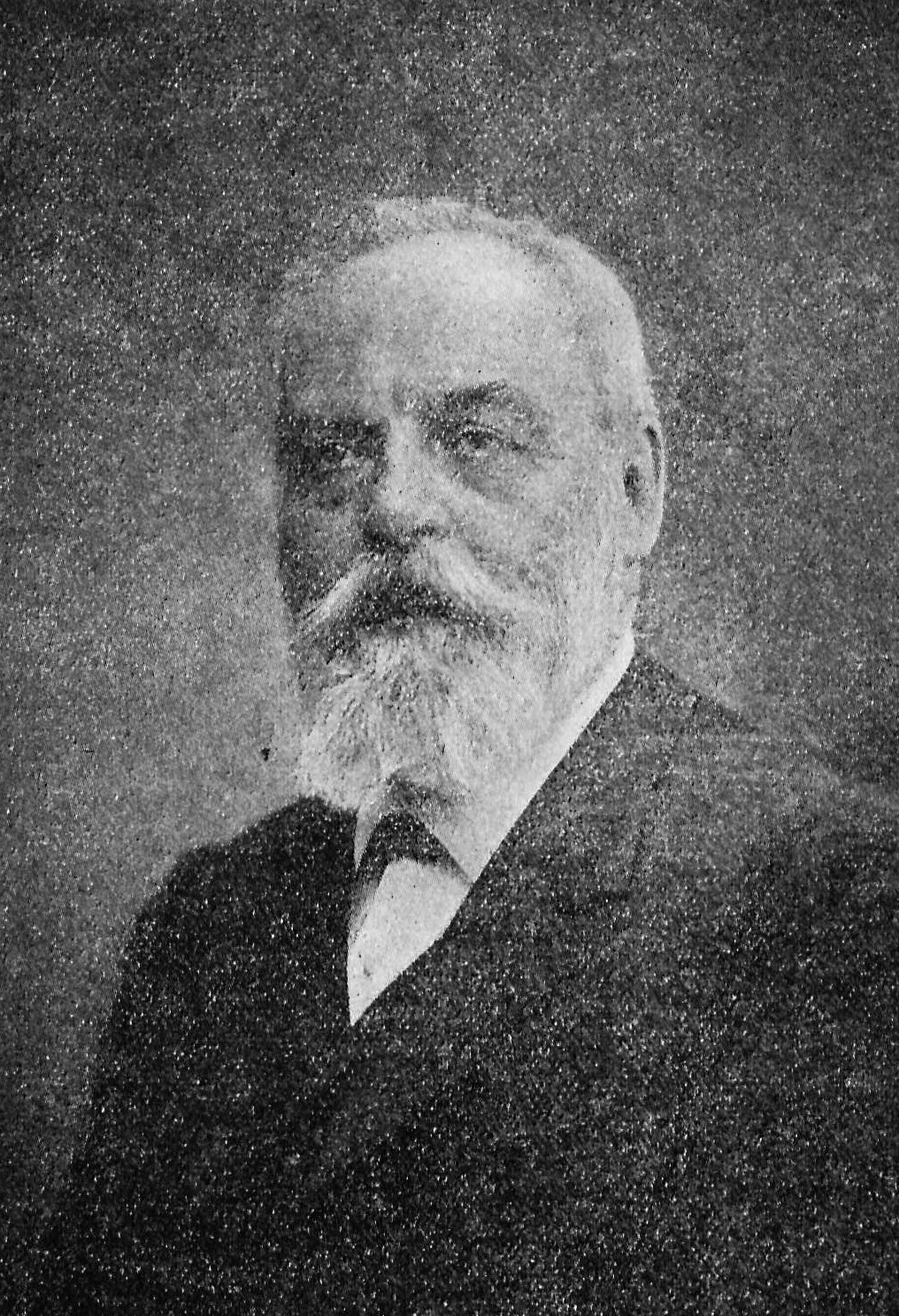
- Born: 4 March 1843; Bordeaux, France
- Died: 10 June 1931 (aged 88); Nancy
- Education: (See text)
- Occupations: Teacher, Professor, Botanist, author,
- Awards: Knight of the Legion of Honor

Georges Le Monnier (French pronunciation: [ʒɔʁʒ lə mɔnje]; March 4, 1843 in Bordeaux – June 10, 1931 in Nancy) was a French scientist who spent much of his career in Nancy.

== Biography ==
Georges Le Monnier was born in Bordeaux in 1843 and then became a student at the École Normale Supérieure (until 1863), became an associate in physics (1866), Doctor of Science (1873), teacher at the Lycée de Niort (1866), trainer at the École Normale Supérieure (1869), professor of physics at the lycée in Pau (1874), lecturer in botany and zoology at the faculty of sciences in Besançon (1874), lecturer in botany at the faculty of sciences in Nancy (1877), then finally professor (in 1877) and honorary professor (in 1912).

He was Deputy mayor of Nancy from 1892 to 1900 and opened the first high school for young girls in Nancy and one of the first in France.

He was the initiator of the Eastern Serotherapeutic Institute, of which he was president. He was the first holder of the Botany Chair of the Faculty of Sciences of Nancy. Georges Le Monnier dealt closely with social issues and their teachings throughout his career.

He received for his entire career the Legion of Honour, but then returned it later. He was a member of the Academy of Stanislas.

He was a very close friend of Auguste Daum (French ceramist) and Émile Gallé (artist and designer who worked in glass). The latter wrote in one of these notebooks: "M. Le Monnier, professor of botany at the Faculty of Sciences of Nancy, gave a lecture on the Darwinian movement in 1877 to a very diverse audience, both male and female. Mr. Le Monnier has set himself a task that would have been difficult for anyone but him. In one hour of talk, Mr. Le Monnier succeeded in making known the great Darwinian movement to a varied public, without the audience, however intelligent, experiencing boredom or fatigue. M. Le Monnier acquitted himself of this task with admirable ease, lightness and grace. The professor knew how to remain scientific and the lecturer charmed a very diverse audience. His gifts of clarity, simplicity, elegance, which distinguish the professor's speech, the lecturer possessed to the highest degree."

Émile Friant painted a portrait of Georges le Monnier in 1898.

He was Professor of Botany at the University of Nancy.

He is honoured in the naming of Lemonniera by De Wild (type of Fungi) in Ann. Soc. Belge Microscop. 18: 147 in 1894. Also Le-monniera Lecomte 1918 (in Sapotaceae family) in Notul. Syst. (Paris) 3: 337 in 1918 which is now a synonym for Neolemonniera Heine 1960 (Sapotaceae).

== Publications ==
- Darwin, his life and his work, Georges Le Monnier, Public Library of Nancy, Speech delivered at the formal opening of the Faculties of Nancy on November 28, 1882.
- Flora of Lorraine, DA. Godron, published by Paul-Henri Fliche and Georges Le Monnier, N. Grosjean, Nancy, third edition, 1883.
- Georges Le Monnier, "The Evolution of Evolutionism, Acceptance speech", in Memoirs of the Academy of Stanislas - 1907 - 1908, Public session of May 21, 1908, Nancy, vol. 6th series, Volume V, Berger- Levrault et Cie, 1908
- Georges Le Monnier, Botany course for the fourth class and agricultural schools, Germer bookstore, Baillères et Cie, 108 boulevard Saint-Germain, Paris, 1881
- Philippe Van Tieghem and Georges Le Monnier, Research on mucorinae, Librairie Masson, place of the School of Medicine, Paris, 1873

== Notes ==
Georges Le Monnier is the father-in-law of the doctor and philosopher Jacques Rennes, of Professor Philibert Guinier and the grandfather of the scientist André Guinier.
