= Günther Porod =

Austrian physicist

Günther Porod (German: [ˈgʏntɐ ˈpɔrɔd]; 1919 in Faak am See near Villach – 1984 in Graz) was an Austrian physicist.

He is best known for his work on the small-angle X-ray scattering method, done in collaboration with Otto Kratky, and in particular for Porod's law, which describes the asymptote of the scattering intensity I(q) for large scattering wave numbers q. In polymer physics, the worm-like chain model, introduced in a 1949 paper, is sometimes called the Kratky–Porod model.

In 1965 Porod was appointed as professor of experimental physics at the university of Graz. In 1978, he was awarded the Erwin Schrödinger-Preis.

== See also ==
- Lyman G. Parratt, American x-ray physicist with somewhat similar name.
