= Lyman G. Parratt =

American physicist

Lyman G. Parratt (May 17, 1908 - June 29, 1995) was an American physicist. He is known for various research using X-rays.

Parratt was born in Salt Lake City.

In 1954, Parratt used X-rays to explore the surface of copper-coated glass, thereby creating the field of X-ray reflectometry.

He died in Redmond, Oregon, aged 87.

== See also ==
- Günther Porod, Austrian X-ray physicist with somewhat similar name.
