= Mass-spring-damper model =

Concept in physics

Classic model used for deriving the equations of a mass spring damper model

The mass-spring-damper model consists of discrete mass nodes distributed throughout an object and interconnected via a network of springs and dampers.

This form of model is also well-suited for modelling objects with complex material behavior such as those with nonlinearity or viscoelasticity.

As well as engineering simulation, these systems have applications in computer graphics and computer animation.

== Derivation ==
The equations of motion for this model are usually derived by summing the forces on the mass (including any applied external forces $F_\text{external})$:

$$F  = -kx - c \dot x +F_\text{external} = m \ddot x$$

By rearranging this equation, one can obtain the standard form:

$\ddot x + 2 \zeta \omega_n \dot x + \omega_n^2 x = u$ where $\omega_n=\sqrt\frac{k}{m}; \quad \zeta = \frac{c}{2 m \omega_n}; \quad u=\frac{F_\text{external}}{m}$

$\omega_n$ is the undamped natural frequency and $\zeta$ is the damping ratio. The homogeneous equation for the mass spring system is:

$$\ddot x + 2 \zeta \omega_n \dot x + \omega_n^2 x = 0$$

This has the solution:

$$x = A e^{-\omega_n t \left(\zeta + \sqrt{\zeta^2-1}\right)} + B e^{-\omega_n t \left(\zeta -
\sqrt{\zeta^2-1}\right)}$$

If $\zeta < 1$ then $\zeta^2-1$ is negative, meaning the square root will be imaginary and therefore the solution will have an oscillatory component.

== See also ==
- Numerical methods
- Soft body dynamics#Spring/mass models
- Finite element analysis
