= Anton Paar =

Austrian scientific instrument company

- Anton Paar logo

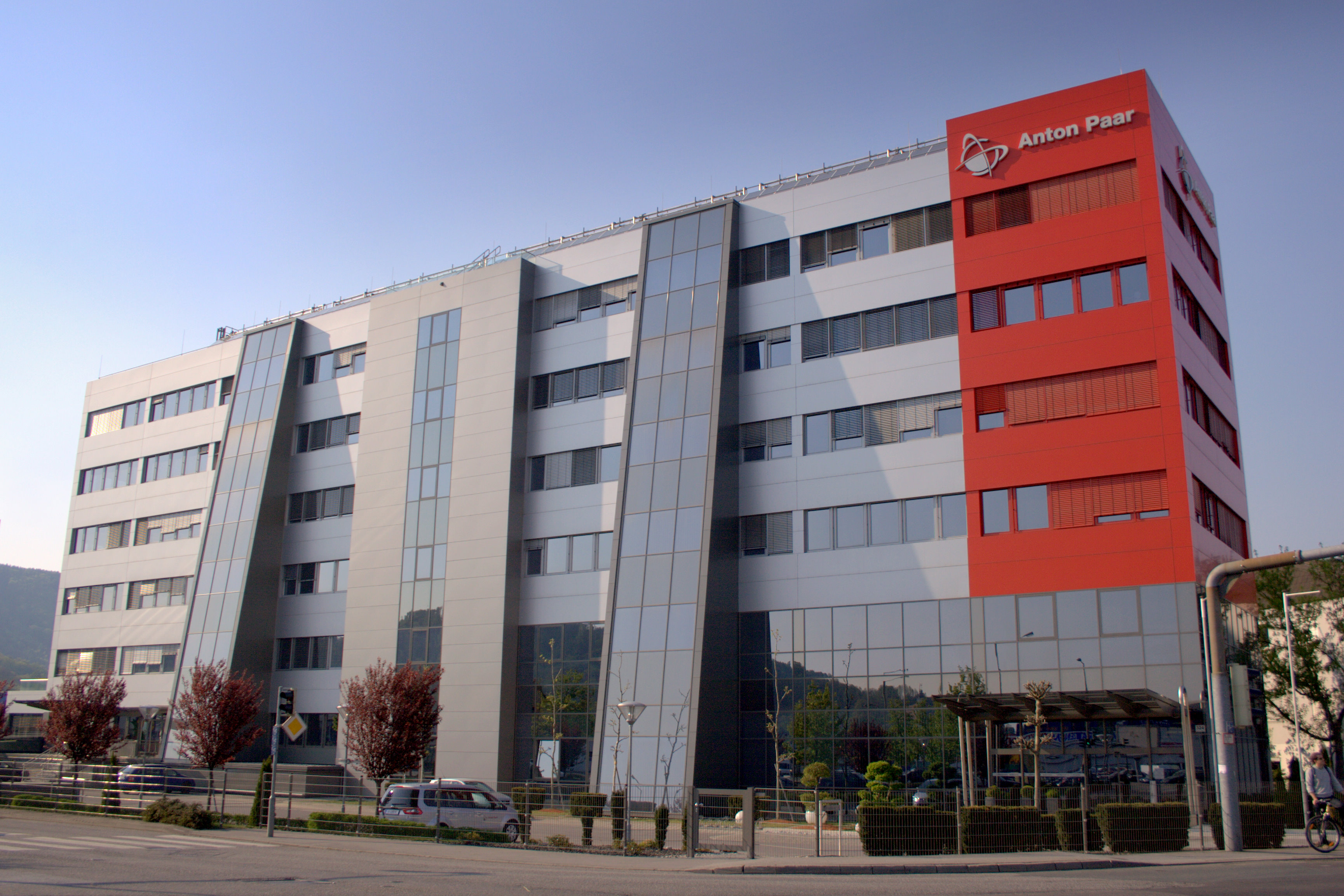
- Headquarters of Anton Paar GmbH in Graz
- Type: GmbH
- Industry: Measuring and control instrument manufacturing
- Founded: 1922 in Austria
- Founder: Anton Paar
- Headquarters: Graz, Austria
- Key people: Jakob Santner, CTO/CEO Dominik Santner, COO
- Services: Develops, produces and distributes laboratory instruments and process measuring systems, and provides automation and robotics.
- Revenue: ▲629 Mio Euro (2025)
- Number of employees: ▲4,500 (2026)
- Website: www.anton-paar.com

Anton Paar GmbH is an Austrian company based in Graz that develops, produces and sells analytical instruments for laboratories and process analytical technology. The company operates globally, with subsidiaries in 40 countries. It also provides automation and robotics. The company specializes in the production of instruments for measuring density, concentration, dissolved carbon dioxide, and in the fields of rheometry and material characterization. Many of Anton Paar's customers are beer and soft drink manufacturers as well as companies in the food, chemicals, and pharmaceutical industries.

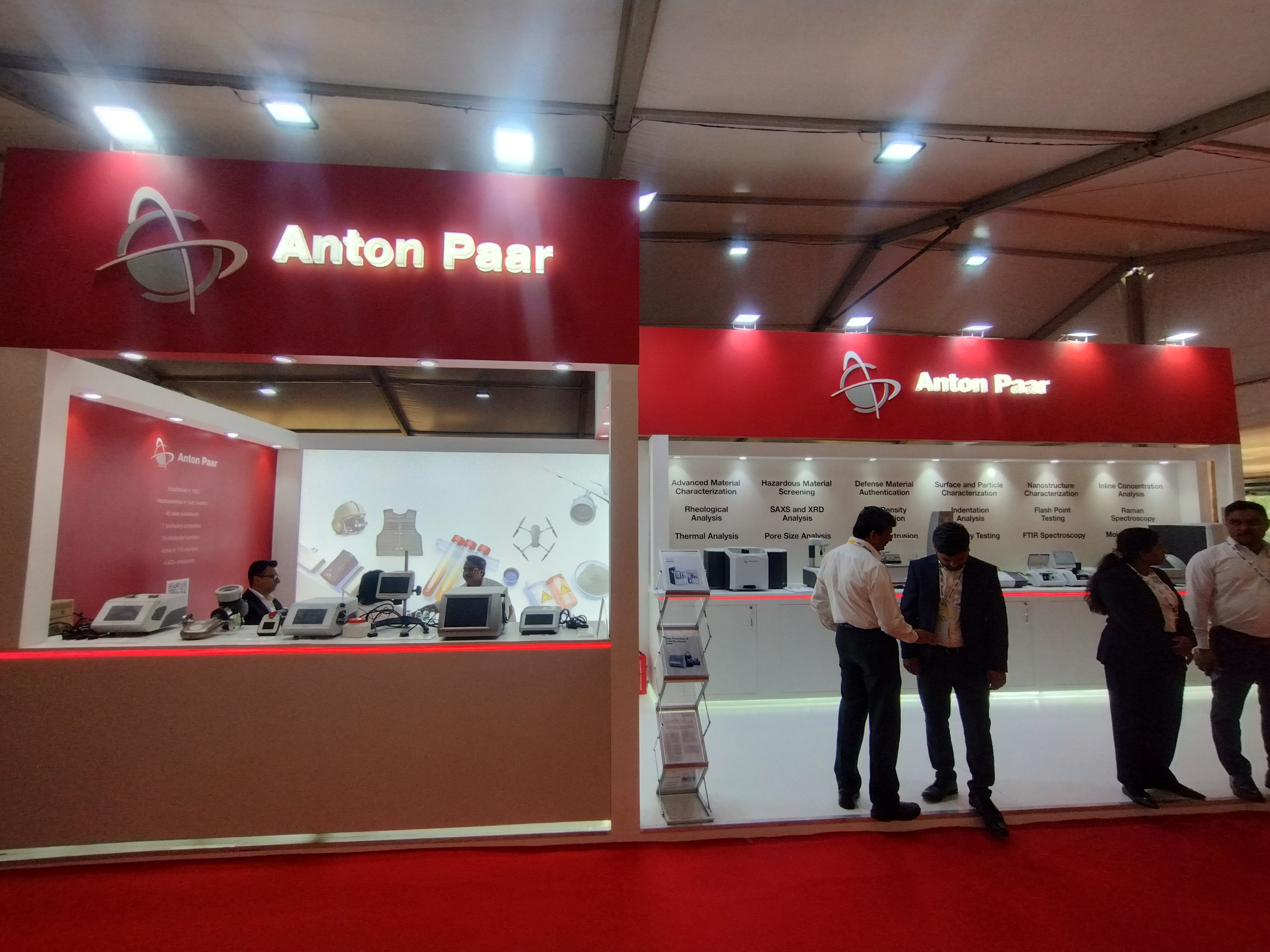
Anton Paar at DEF-TECH Bharat 2026, KTPO, Bengaluru

== History ==
The company was founded in 1922 by locksmith Anton Paar. He trained his daughter, Margareta Platzer, in the 1920s to become a locksmith. She and Otto Kratky developed the Kratky X-ray small-angle camera.

In 1963, Platzer's son-in-law Ulrich Santner took over the management of the company. In 1997, his son-in-law Friedrich Santner joined the management. Since 2002 he is the sole managing director.

In 2003, the family business was incorporated into a charitable organization, the Santner Foundation.

On February 12, 2018, Anton Paar acquired Quantachrome Instruments, a manufacturer of scientific instruments. In August 2023, the German company Brabender was bought by Anton Paar and has since continued as Anton Paar TorqueTec.

In 2020, Friedrich Santner's sons became part of the management. Jakob Santner took over the position as CTO and Dominik Santner as COO; Friedrich Santner remains CEO.

As of January 1, 2025, Jakob Santner and Dominik Santner serve as the Managing Directors of Anton Paar GmbH. Friedrich Santner has transitioned to the role of Chairman of the Executive Board of the parent company, Anton Paar Group AG, which operates as an investment holding company.
