= Asuaju de Sus =

- Commune
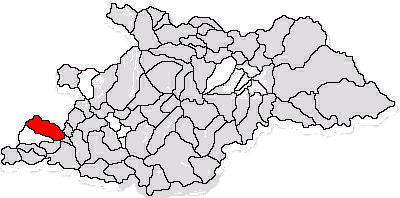
- Location in Maramureș County

- Location in Romania
- Coordinates: 47°34′01″N 23°10′56″E
- Country: Romania
- County: Maramureș
- Subdivisions: Asuaju de Jos, Asuaju de Sus

Government
  - Mayor (2024–2028): Vasile Dulf (PNL)
- Area: 59 km^{2} (23 sq mi)
- Elevation: 200 m (660 ft)
- Population (2021-12-01): 1,117
  - Density: 19/km^{2} (49/sq mi)
- Time zone: UTC+02:00 (EET)
  - Summer (DST): UTC+03:00 (EEST)
- Postal code: 437015
- Area code: +40 x59
- Vehicle reg.: MM
- Website: comunaasuajudesus.ro

Asuaju de Sus (Hungarian: Felsőszivágy) is a commune in Maramureș County, Crișana, Romania. It is composed of two villages, Asuaju de Jos (Alsószivágy) and Asuaju de Sus.

The commune is located in the southwestern part of Maramureș County, 20 km (12 mi) northwest of Ulmeni and 42 km (26 mi) east of the county seat, Baia Mare, on the border with Satu Mare County. The river Asuaj flows through this commune. Its neighbors are the communes Ariniș, Băița de sub Codru, Homoroade, and Bârsău.

Historical population
Year	Pop.	±%
1880	2,187	—
1900	2,448	+11.9%
1910	2,630	+7.4%
1930	2,656	+1.0%
1956	2,567	−3.4%
1977	2,402	−6.4%
1992	1,793	−25.4%
2002	1,615	−9.9%
2011	1,441	−10.8%
2021	1,117	−22.5%
Source: Census data
