= Hosszú =

Hosszú or Hossu is a surname. Notable people with the surname include:

- Katinka Hosszú (born 1989), Hungarian swimmer
- Emil Hossu (1941–2012), Romanian actor
- Iuliu Hossu (1885–1970), bishop of the Romanian Greek Catholic Church
- Francisc Hossu-Longin (1847–1935), lawyer and memoirist
- Elena Pop-Hossu-Longin (1862–1940), Romanian women's rights activist

== See also ==
- Hossu
