= Tămășești =

Tămășești may refer to several places in Romania:

- Tămășești, a village in Bălești, Gorj County
- Tămășești, a village in Zam Commune, Hunedoara County
- Tămășești, a village in Ariniș Commune, Maramureș County
- Tămășești (Sălaj), a tributary of the Sălaj in Maramureș County
- Tămășești, a tributary of the Zam in Hunedoara County
