= Sălaj (river) =

- Location within Romania

Location
- Country: Romania
- Counties: Sălaj, Maramureș
- Villages: Verveghiu, Sălățig, Cehu Silvaniei, Ariniș, Sălsig

Physical characteristics
- Source
  - location: Sălaj County
- Mouth: Someș
  - location: Sălsig, Maramureș County
  - coordinates: 47.5267°N 23.3152°E
- Length: 39 km (24 mi)
- Basin size: 457 km^{2} (176 sq mi)

Basin features
- Progression: Someș→ Tisza→ Danube→ Black Sea

The Sălaj is a left tributary of the river Someș in Romania. It discharges into the Someș in Sălsig. Its length is 39 km (24 mi) and its basin size is 457 km^{2} (176 sq mi).

== Tributaries ==
The following rivers are tributaries to the river Sălaj:

- Left: Mineu, Cioara, Cămin, Oarța, Băsești, Tămășești, Urmeniș, Asuaj
- Right: Valea Râturilor
