= Băsești (disambiguation) =

Băsești may refer to the following places in Romania:

- Băsești, a commune in Maramureș County
- Băsești, a village in Bâlvănești Commune, Mehedinți County
- Băsești, the former name of the commune Călmățuiu de Sus in Teleorman County
- Băsești, the former name of the commune Viișoara in Vaslui County
- Băsești (river), a tributary of the Sălaj in Maramureș County
