= Urmeniș (disambiguation) =

Urmeniș may refer to the following places in Romania:

- Urmeniș, a commune in Bistrița-Năsăud County
- Urmeniș, a village in the commune Băița de sub Codru, Maramureș County
- Urmeniș, a tributary of the Lechința in Bistrița-Năsăud and Mureș Counties
- Urmeniș (Sălaj), a river in Maramureș County
- Urmeniș (Trotuș), a river in Bacău County
