= Gheorghe Pop de Băsești =

Imperial Austrian-born Romanian lawyer and politician

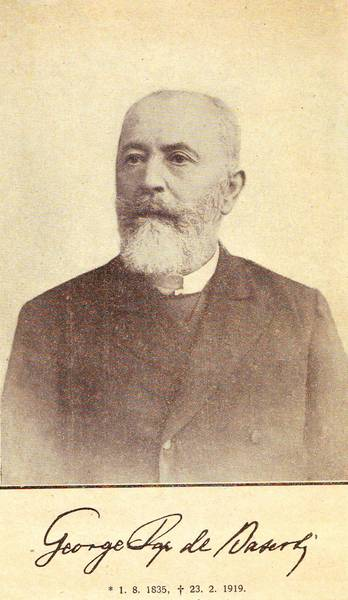

President of the Romanian National Party
- In office 1902 – 23 February 1919

Member of the National Assembly of Hungary
- In office 3 September 1872 – 1 June 1881

President of the Great National Assembly of Alba Iulia
- In office 1 December 1918 – 2 December 1918

Personal details
- Born: 1 August 1835 Szilágyillésfalva/Băsești, Austrian Empire (now Băsești, Romania)
- Died: 23 February 1919 (aged 83) Băsești, Kingdom of Romania
- Party: National Party of 1848; Independence Party; Romanian National Party
- Education: Nagyvárad Law Academy
- Occupation: Lawyer, politician

Military service
- Allegiance: Austrian Empire
- Years of service: 1859–1860
- Battles/wars: Second Italian War of Independence

Gheorghe (or George) Pop de Băsești (pronounced [ˈɡe̯orɡe pop de bəˈseʃtʲ, ˈdʒe̯ordʒe -]; 1 August 1835 – 23 February 1919), also known under the nickname Badea Gheorghe or Badea George (roughly "Brother/Uncle George"), was an Imperial Austrian-born Romanian politician, philanthropist and patriot, who served as vice president (1881–1902) and president (1902–1919) of the Romanian National Party at a time when Transylvania was part of the Kingdom of Hungary within Austria-Hungary, and eventually as the president of the Great National Assembly of Alba Iulia that declared the Union of Transylvania with Romania on 1 December 1918.

== Early life ==
Gheorghe Pop de Băsești was born on 1 August 1835 in the village of Szilágyillésfalva/Băsești (Transylvania, Austrian Empire), as the son of Petru Pop de Băsești and Susana Pop de Turț, both members of the local gentry. His paternal uncle, Grigore Pop de Băsești, was also a member of the Parliament of Hungary. He completed the gymnasium in Nagybánya/Baia Mare (the first 6 grades) and in Nagyvárad/Oradea (the last 2 grades of the gymnasium), before moving on to study law at the Nagyvárad Academy.

After graduating from the Oradea Academy in 1859, Pop de Băsești found a clerk's job, but shortly after he was conscripted in the Austrian Imperial Army and participated in the Second Italian War of Independence (1859–1860).

In 1860, after he had been released from the active service, Pop de Băsești returned to his native county, where he worked as first praetor in Hadad/Hodod and as a judge. In 1860, he married Maria Loșonți, with whom he had 2 children: Maria Carolina (who died at the age of 1 on 16 January 1862) and Elena (1862–1940). According to a source, Maria Loșonți, the widow of the Baron Sebeși, had had with Pop de Băsești in 1859 another daughter out of wedlock, Ana, before they married one year later.

== Political activity ==
=== Deputy in the Diet of Hungary ===
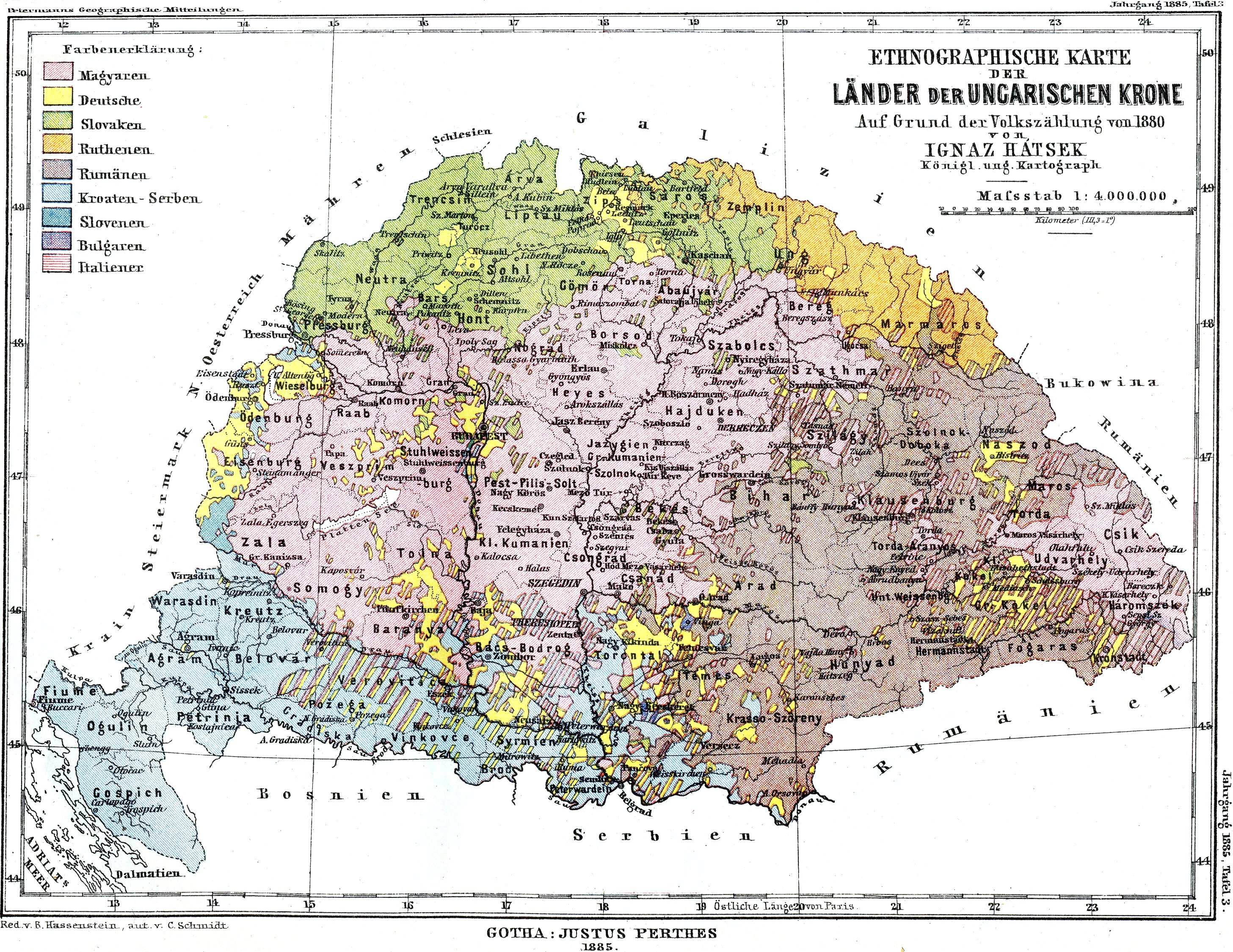
Ethnic groups of the Hungarian Kingdom according to the 1880 census (ethnic Romanians depicted in grey)

On 22 June 1872, Pop de Băsești was elected for the first time deputy in the Hungarian diet in the Szilágycseh electoral district, where, for the following nine years (he was again elected in 1875 and 1878), he advocated for the rights of ethnic Romanians living in Transylvania. In that capacity Pop de Băsești protested vehemently against the consequences of the Austro-Hungarian Compromise of 1867 and the Magyarization conducted via the education laws of 1868 and 1879, the Nationalities Law, the Electoral and Press laws, comparing the status of the Romanians in the Kingdom of Hungary with that of the Irish in the United Kingdom of Great Britain and Ireland: "For the Ireland of the Magyar state, for this is what the unfortunate Transylvania is, we have endured in these lands for longer than 2000 years. All our tribulations and hopes bond us to the land on which we live". On the adoption of the Trefort education bill in 1879, which sought to make the Hungarian language mandatory in primary and confessional schools, Pop de Băsești stated the following: "If it's a sin to make an attempt on another man's life, in the case of the present law it is a greater sin to make an attempt on the life of an ethnicity, even of more nationalities, of all nationalities of the Lands of the Crown of Saint Stephen".

Gheorghe Pop as a member of the Hungarian Parliament

Pop de Băsești's personality gained the respect of his political opponent Kálmán Tisza, who declared: "You're a fierce man, fanatical Daco-Romanian! We are a world apart from each other. We shall never find any common ground. However I respect the deep conviction with which you defended so heartily the cause of your people".

In 1879, Pop de Băsești resigned from the Independence Party (where he held the position of vice president) after having lost the belief that Romanians' and Hungarians' interests could be reconciled. His resignation provided the occasion for Kálmán Tisza to attempt convincing Gheorghe Pop de Băsești to join his party: "We would need brave and determined men. Come and join us and I guarantee there is no dignity in Hungary you couldn't obtain", to which Pop de Băsești replied: "Even if you gave me the whole Hungary I would not betray the righteous cause of my poor and unfortunate people, who, beside God, my comrades and myself, has no other defenders against your oppressive tendencies".

=== Romanian National Party ===
Subsequently, Pop de Băsești joined the National Party of Romanians in Transylvania. Between 12 and 14 May 1881, he participated at the national conference in Nagyszeben that sealed the merger of the National Party of Romanians in Transylvania with the National Party of Romanians in Banat and Hungary into the Romanian National Party (Romanian: Partidul Național Român, PNR). Pop de Băsești was also elected in the executive committee of the party as the central coordinator for the Szilágy, Szatmár and Máramaros counties.

In 1881, Pop de Băsești ran again for a deputy seat in Szilágycseh, however he lost after the authorities called in 120 gendarmes from 5 surrounding counties. He would not run again until 1905, after the PNR had abandoned the strategy of political passivism.

=== The Transylvanian Memorandum ===
At the 1887 national conference of the PNR the participants voiced their grievances in regard to the worsening situation of the ethnic Romanians in the Kingdom of Hungary and decided to present the Emperor a petition encompassing the growing complaints against the consequences of the Ausgleich: the discrimination and the Magyarization process conducted against the ethnic Romanians, their underrepresentation in the Hungarian Parliament through the electoral laws despite their demographic majority in Transylvania and the way the Ausgleich was adopted, without consulting the Transylvanians. Nevertheless, at the next national conference (1890) it was decided to postpone this endeavor to a later, more convenient date. As a result of this decision, in November 1891, Pop de Băsești asked for the resignation of the PNR president Vincențiu Babeș and argued that the leadership of PNR should be taken over "by an appeasing person, with a calm temperament and above all totally independent and master of his own ideas and beliefs".

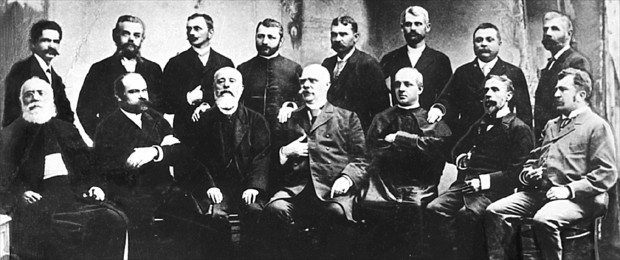
The signatories of the Memorandum (among them Gheorghe Pop de Băsești, third from the left, bottom row)

Heeding his call, the delegates of the PNR elected in 1892 Ioan Rațiu as president and Pop de Băsești as vice president of the PNR. The new leaders decided to task Vasile Lucaciu and Iuliu Coroianu with drafting and publishing the petition. Under the name of "Transylvanian Memorandum", the petition was approved by the PNR on 25 March 1892 and brought on 28 May 1892 to Vienna by 300 delegates of the PNR (among them 48 members from Szilágy County, including Pop de Băsești) to be presented to the Emperor Franz Joseph in a sealed envelope. At the request of the Hungarian government, Franz Joseph did not receive the delegation and forwarded the unopened envelope to the Hungarian Prime-Minister, which in turn forwarded it unopened to the Torda-Aranyos Ispán in order to be returned to the sender, Ioan Rațiu, arguing that the Hungarian Ministry of Interior was not authorized to present the Emperor with petitions of individuals not entitled to represent the ethnic Romanians in Hungary.

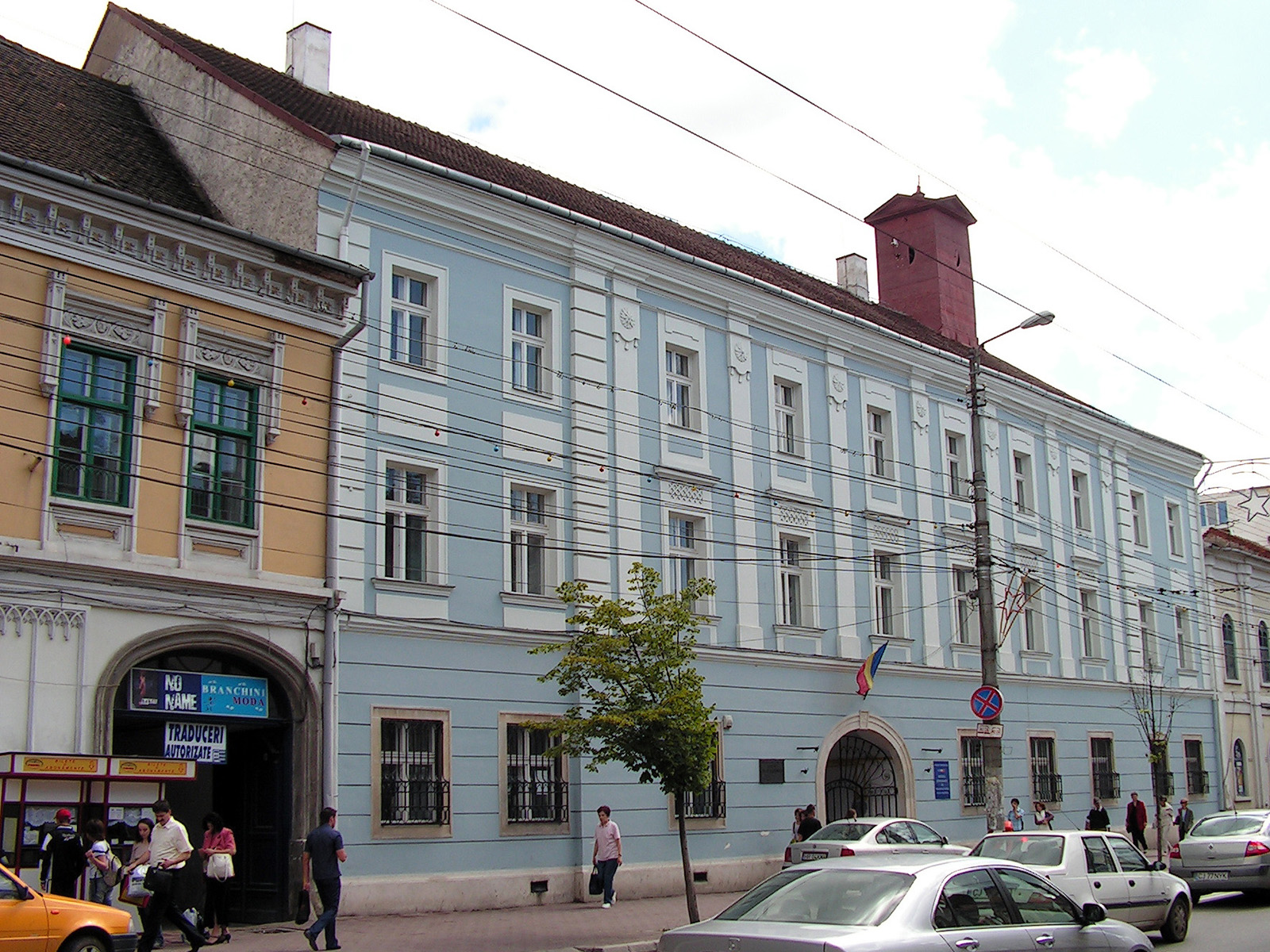
The building (called "Redoubt", nowadays the Ethnographic Museum of Transylvania) where the trial took place between 7 and 27 May 1894

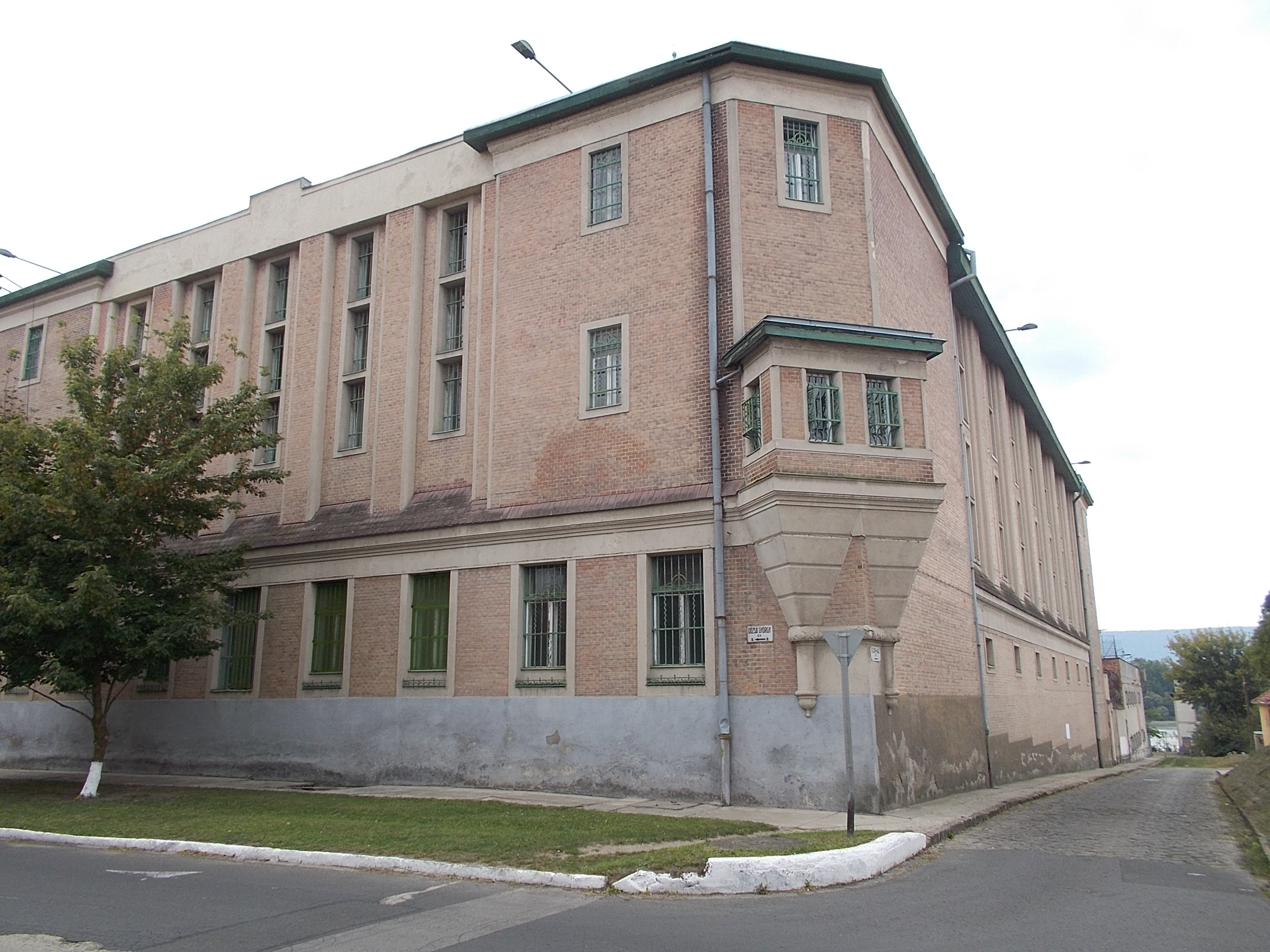
Vác Prison (as of 2015)

Met with refusal, PNR published the memorandum in the press. Tensions ran high: Rațiu's home in Torda was damaged by Hungarian demonstrators, leading to protests in Romania. After a while, the government in Budapest gave in to pressure from the Hungarian nationalists and in May 1893 it launched proceedings against the PNR president, Raţiu, the vice president, Pop de Băsești, the secretaries Vasile Lucaciu and Septimiu Albini, and other PNR leaders who acknowledged their involvement in drafting and publishing the petition.

Consequently, on 7 May 1894, 14 leaders of the PNR, including Pop de Băsești, were put on trial in Kolozsvár for various charges, ranging from disturbing the peace to high treason. On 25 May 1894, the verdicts were handed down: all the accused were found guilty, and on 27 May 1894, the judge sentenced them to imprisonment for terms ranging from 5 years (Vasile Lucaciu) to 1 year, in total 31 years and 2 months. Pop de Băsești was handed the mildest sentence (of one-year imprisonment), his only regret being that he received less than the others. Present at the trial, Octavian Goga witnessed that moment: "All the accused acknowledged the sentences in a manful manner. Leading the group, Father Lucaciu seemed to be an ancient hero. Mr. Rațiu came in with his head held high. [..] Only Brother Gheorghe wept because he said they mocked him by handing him a milder sentence than his fellows."

On 28 July 1894, the PNR was banned by the Hungarian authorities, who invoked the lack of a party statute and "relations with foreign elements".

Pop de Băsești served his sentence in the Vác prison until 5 August 1895. As his wife Maria passed away he was shortly released on parole on 11 June 1895 so that he could attend her burial. Eventually all signatories of the memorandum were pardoned by Emperor Franz Joseph in 1895, following secret negotiations between Austria-Hungary and the Romanian king Carol I.

=== Later political activity ===
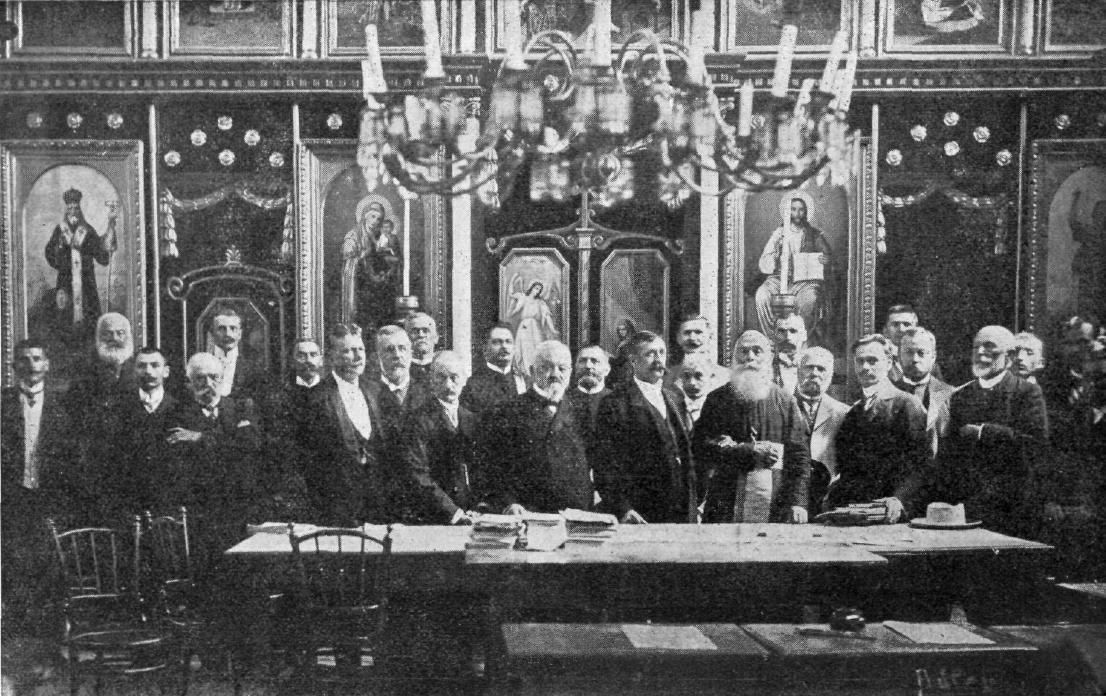
A picture taken inside the Greek Catholic Church in Szilágysomlyó/Șimleu Silvaniei during the Annual General Meeting of ASTRA, held between 7 and 9 August 1908. Gheorghe Pop de Băsești is the first from the right, front row

After Ioan Rațiu's death in 1902, Gheorghe Pop de Băsești was elected president of the PNR.

On 10 January 1905, Pop de Băsești summoned the national conference of the PNR in Nagyszeben, where it was decided to rescind the policy of political passivism and to engage again in the electoral process. At the elections that year he ran for the deputy seat in Szilágycseh, nevertheless he lost in the second round against the Liberal candidate, Baron Elemér Bornemisza, after harsh measures had been employed to rig the results: Pop de Băsești (then 69 years old) and his supporters were beaten (some of them to death) by political opponents. The situation would repeat during the 1906 elections.

=== Philanthropic work ===
Although he never abandoned politics, Gheorghe Pop de Băsești focused on providing for poor children in his native area, sponsoring Romanian-language magazines in Transylvania (Federațiunea, Lupta, Gazeta de Transilvania) and founding credit unions to help the ethnic Romanians. By 1909, Pop de Băsești led 6 credit unions: "Aurora" (Naybánya/Baia Mare), "Chiorana" (Nagysomkút/Șomcuta Mare), "Codreana" (Szilágyillésfalva/Băseşti), "Sătmăreana" (Szinérváralja/Seini), "Sălăgeana" and "Silvania" (Szilágysomlyó/Șimleu Silvaniei). He also served in the board of directors of the Banca Albina and wrote a book about agriculture.

When the World War I started, Pop de Băsești decided to write his testament and leave his whole wealth (estimated at 4 million Kronen) to the Greek Catholic Metropolitan in Balázsfalva/Blaj. The will provided that the donated wealth was to be used to establish agricultural schools and Romanian cultural institutes, to award scholarships and to help preserve the local church and school in his native village of Băsești.

=== President of the Great National Assembly of Alba Iulia ===
The Great National Assembly of Alba Iulia (1 December 1918)

Towards the end of World War I, the Austrio-Hungarian monarchy began to disintegrate. On 18 October 1918, inspired by Wilson's Fourteen Points and mandated by the executive committee of the PNR, deputy Alexandru Vaida-Voevod demanded in the Hungarian Diet the right of self-determination of the Romanians in Hungary, and afterwards the executive committee established the Romanian National Council, which proceeded to organize elections for a National Assembly of all Romanians in Hungary.

On 30 November 1918 Pop de Băsești, elected as a representative and accompanied by lieutenant Alexandru Kiș of the Romanian National Guard, set off by train to Alba Iulia, despite his old age. The trip was not without incident: in the Războieni railway station their railcar was fired upon by the Hungarian National Guard, killing Ioan Arion. However, according to other sources, Ioan Arion, the 24-year old representative of Agriș, was killed in the Teiuș railway station. After he had arrived in Alba Iulia, on a blistering cold day, the monk Leon Manu asked him: "For the love of God, Brother George, how could you venture to make such a long and exhausting journey on such weather?", to which Pop de Băsești replied: "How could I have missed it since I've been waiting for this day for 80 years? I came even if I should pay with my life for this, because now nothing else remains for me to say but the following, like the righteous Simeon of the Gospels: 'Lord, now let your servant depart in peace'".

The event in Alba Iulia attracted large crowds, which put the local lodging capacity under strain. After a long wait and repeated requests, Pop de Băsești and lieutenant Kiș were finally given an unheated room in the Hotel "Hungaria" (whose name was later changed to "Dacia"). They were later joined there by Pop de Băseşti's son-in-law Francisc Hossu-Longin, who was the representative of Deva in the Great National Assembly.

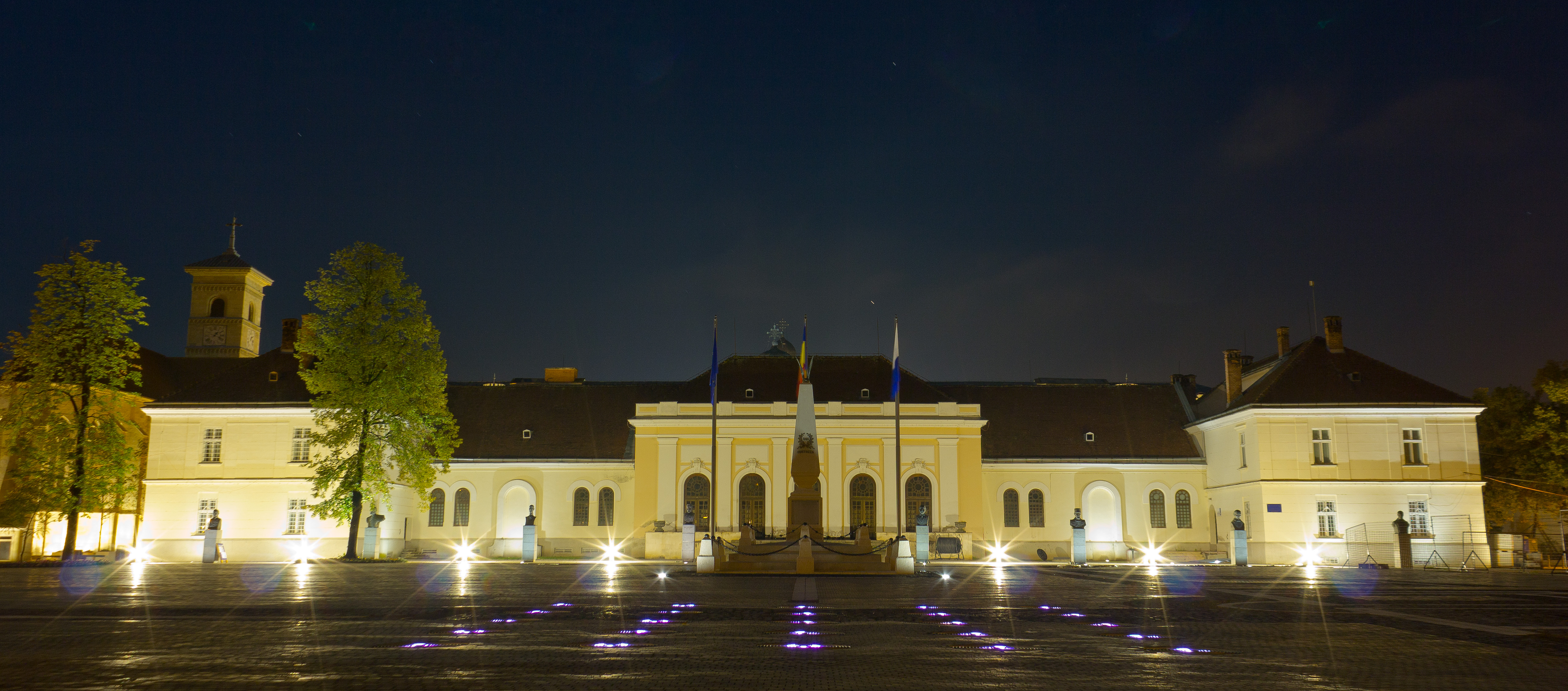
The Alba Iulia Military Casino (nowadays Union Hall), where the representatives of the Great National Assembly convened on 1 and 2 December 1918

On 1 December 1918, at Iuliu Maniu's proposal, Pop de Băsești was elected president of the Assembly. As a leading figure of the PNR he unified all the divergent currents in the Assembly and bridged the differences, his election as president ending all rivalries among the representatives. In his opening speech he emphasized that the Great National Assembly of all Romanians of Transylvania and the Banat was destined to obliterate the bondage of the past, ending with the following words: "Brethren, let yourselves be enthralled by the holy joy of this bright national feast and in the utmost brotherly harmony let us lay the foundation of our future happiness. God bless this assembly and its resolutions". On the same day the Assembly unanimously decreed the union between the Romanian Old Kingdom and Transylvania, the Banat, Crișana and Maramureș.

The next day the Assembly established the High National Romanian Council (Romanian: Marele Sfat Național Român) as the provisional parliament of Transylvania, and the Directory Council of Transylvania, Banat and the Romanian Lands in Hungary (Romanian: Consiliul Dirigent al Transilvaniei, Banatului și ținuturilor românești din Ungaria) as the provisional government of Transylvania, electing Gheorghe Pop de Băsești as president of the High Council and Iuliu Maniu as president of the Directory Council. After closing the session of the High National Romanian Council, Pop de Băsești repeated the words attributed to Simeon: "Lord, now let your servant depart in peace", adding "as I have seen the salvation of my people".

== Death ==
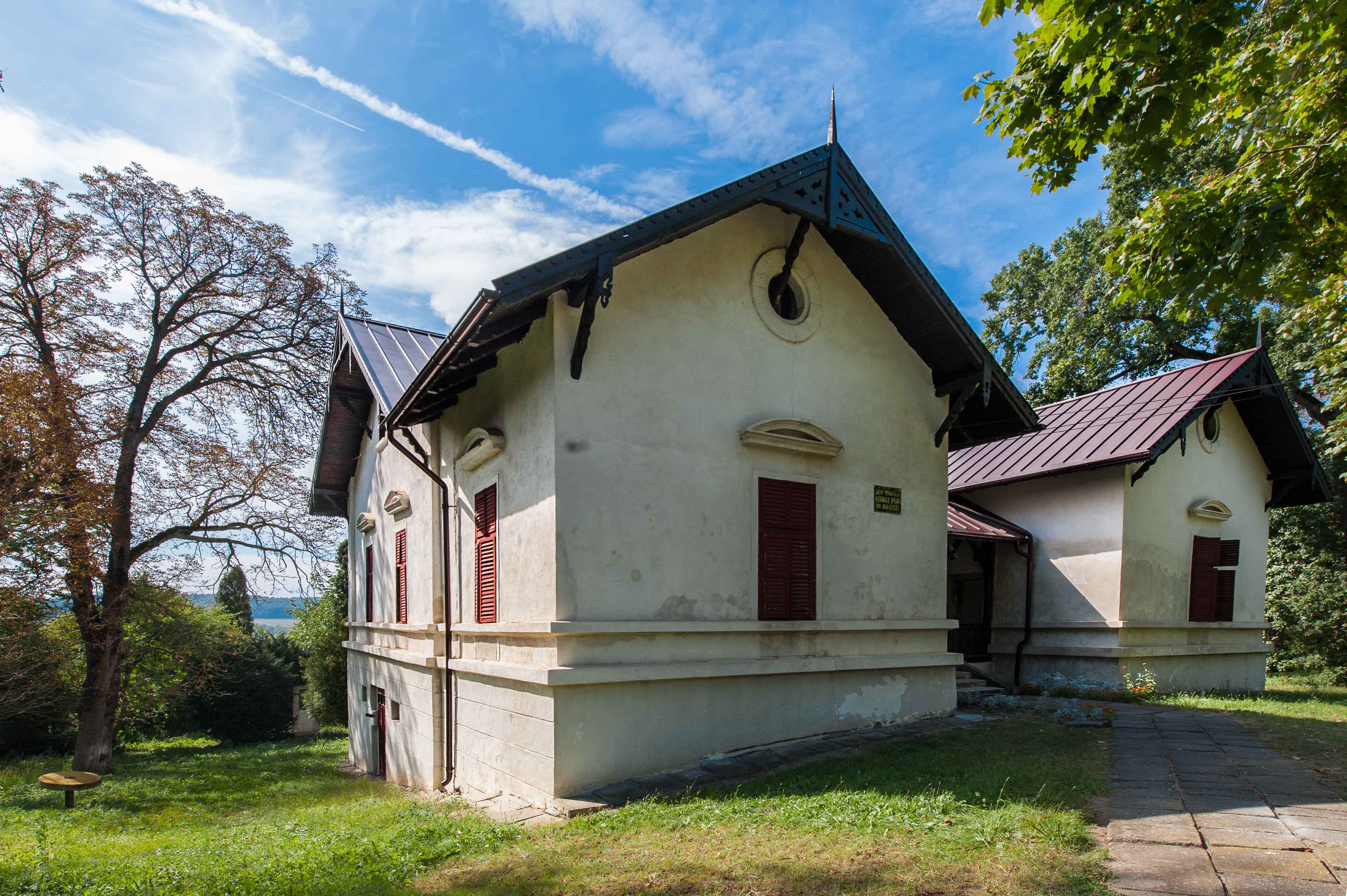
Gheorghe Pop de Băsești Memorial House (as of 2014)

After spending a couple of days at his daughter's house in Deva and two night stops in Teiuș and Cluj (also not without incidents), on the way back from the Ulmeni railway station to his home in Băsești, on an icy weather, Pop de Băsești caught a severe cold that would confine him to bed. According to another source, his overnight stay in the unheated hotel room in Alba Iulia was another cause for him becoming ill. The prolonged illness caused his death a few months later on 23 February 1919, at the age of 83, after skirmishes of the initial stage of the Hungarian–Romanian War had been occurring in the neighboring villages of Stremț/Bükktótfalu and Odești/Vadafalva.

Pop de Băsești was buried in his native village while the funeral procession was fired upon by Hungarian troops. His epitaph reads: "Lord, now let your servant depart in peace", the words he uttered at Alba Iulia. Pop de Băsești's birthplace is now home to a memorial museum.

== Gallery ==
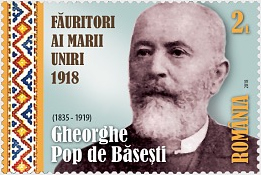
Gheorghe Pop de Băsești on a 2018 stamp of Romania

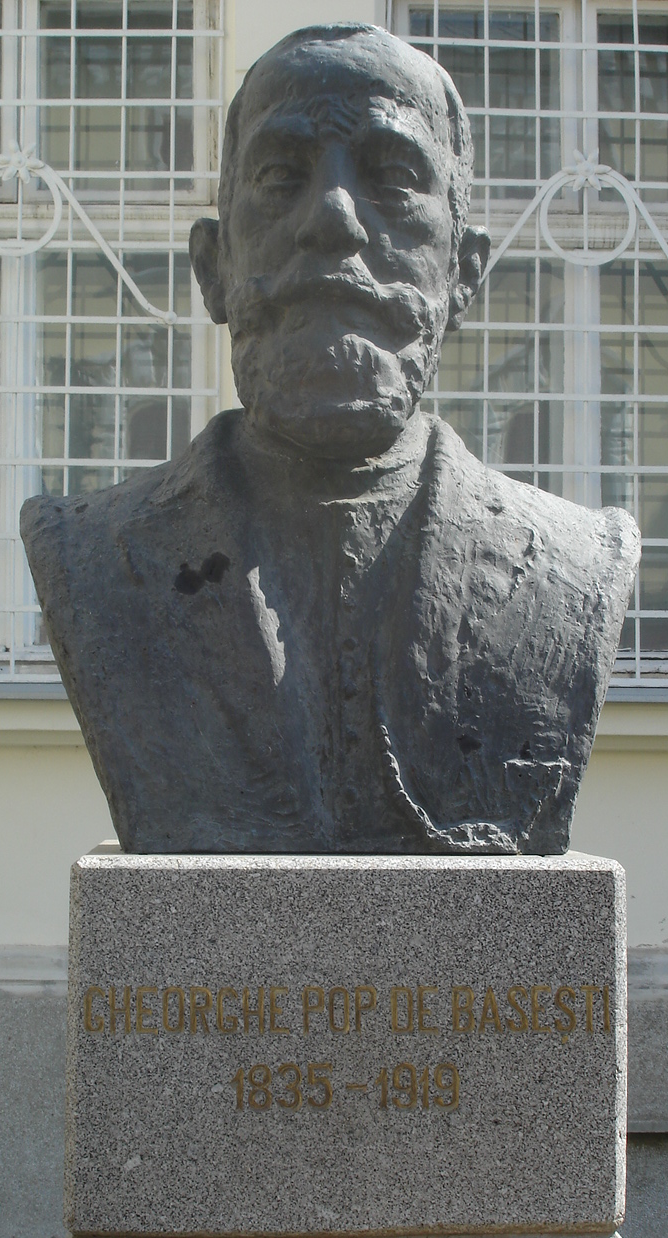
Bust in Alba Iulia
