= Urmeniș (Sălaj) =

- Location within Romania

Location
- Country: Romania
- Counties: Maramureș County
- Villages: Băița de sub Codru, Urmeniș

Physical characteristics
- Source: Asuaju Hills
- Mouth: Sălaj
  - location: Ariniș
  - coordinates: 47.5018°N 23.2473°E
- Length: 17 km (11 mi)
- Basin size: 42 km^{2} (16 sq mi)

Basin features
- Progression: Sălaj→ Someș→ Tisza→ Danube→ Black Sea

The Urmeniș is a left tributary of the river Sălaj in Romania. It flows into the Sălaj in Ariniș. Its length is 17 km (11 mi) and its basin size is 42 km^{2} (16 sq mi).
