= Sălaj =

Sălaj may refer to:

- Sălaj County, Romania
- Sălaj (river), in Romania
- Sălaj (Bucharest), a quarter of Sector 5, Bucharest, Romania
