= Oarța de Jos =

- Commune
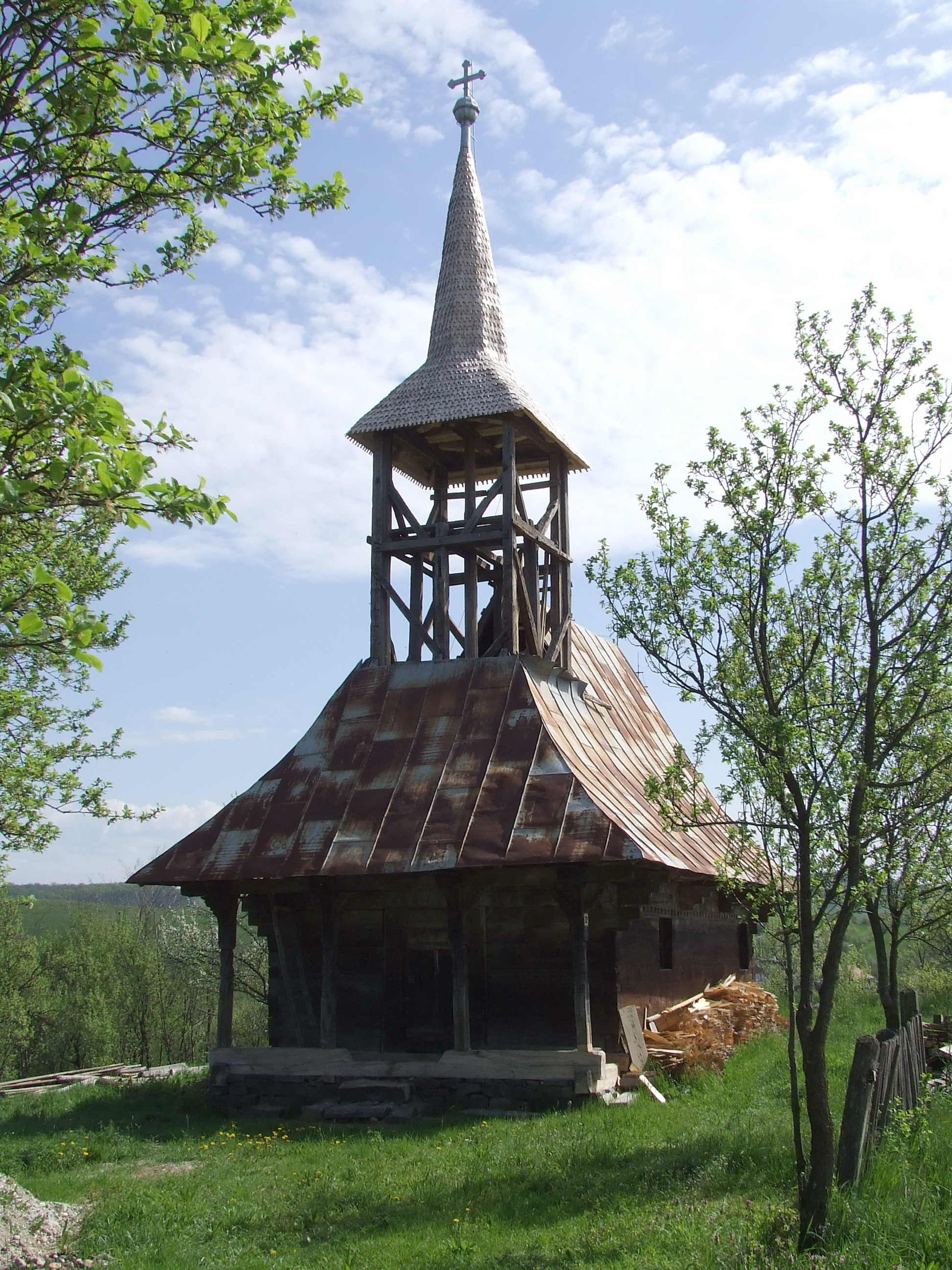
- Wooden church in Orțița

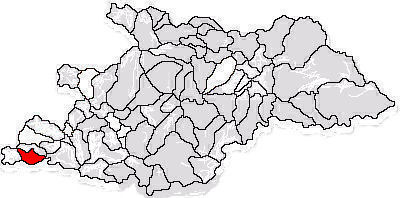
- Location in Maramureș County

- Location in Romania
- Coordinates: 47°27′N 23°8′E
- Country: Romania
- County: Maramureș

Government
  - Mayor (2020–2024): Bogdan Pop (CMM)
- Area: 31.32 km^{2} (12.09 sq mi)
- Elevation: 260 m (850 ft)
- Highest elevation: 280 m (920 ft)
- Lowest elevation: 192 m (630 ft)
- Population (2021-12-01): 982
  - Density: 31.4/km^{2} (81.2/sq mi)
- Time zone: UTC+02:00 (EET)
  - Summer (DST): UTC+03:00 (EEST)
- Postal code: 437200
- Area code: +(40) 262
- Vehicle reg.: MM
- Website: oartadejos.ro

Oarța de Jos (Hungarian: Alsóvárca) is a commune in Maramureș County, Crișana, Romania. It is composed of three villages: Oarța de Jos, Oarța de Sus (Felsővárca), and Orțița (Középvárca).

The commune is located in the southwestern part of the county, at a distance of 52 km (32 mi) from the county seat, Baia Mare. It lies on the border with Sălaj County, 10 km (6.2 mi) northwest of Cehu Silvaniei. The river Oarța flows through the commune's three villages.

Historical population
Year	Pop.	±%
1880	1,614	—
1900	1,730	+7.2%
1910	1,856	+7.3%
1930	2,091	+12.7%
1956	2,281	+9.1%
1977	1,943	−14.8%
1992	1,606	−17.3%
2002	1,412	−12.1%
2011	1,243	−12.0%
2021	982	−21.0%
Source: Census data

At the 2021 census, the commune had 982 inhabitants, of which 93.18% were Romanians.
