= Mineu =

- Location within Romania

Location
- Country: Romania
- Counties: Sălaj County
- Villages: Bocșița, Mineu, Sălățig

Physical characteristics
- Mouth: Sălaj
  - location: Sălățig
  - coordinates: 47.3716°N 23.1425°E
- Length: 17 km (11 mi)
- Basin size: 39 km^{2} (15 sq mi)

Basin features
- Progression: Sălaj→ Someș→ Tisza→ Danube→ Black Sea

The Mineu is a left tributary of the river Sălaj in Romania. It flows into the Sălaj in Sălățig. Its length is 17 km (11 mi) and its basin size is 39 km^{2} (15 sq mi).
