= Asuaj =

- Location within Romania

Location
- Country: Romania
- Counties: Maramureș County
- Villages: Asuaju de Sus, Asuaju de Jos

Physical characteristics
- Mouth: Sălaj
  - location: near Rodina
  - coordinates: 47.5173°N 23.2749°E
- Length: 15 km (9.3 mi)
- Basin size: 76 km^{2} (29 sq mi)

Basin features
- Progression: Sălaj→ Someș→ Tisza→ Danube→ Black Sea
- Tributaries
  - left: Stârcul

The Asuaj is a left tributary of the river Sălaj in Romania. It flows into the Sălaj near Rodina. Its length is 15 km (9.3 mi) and its basin size is 76 km^{2} (29 sq mi).
