= Tămășești River =

Tămășești River may refer to one of the following rivers in Romania

- Tămășești River (Sălaj) - tributary of the Sălaj
- Tămășești - tributary of the Zam in Hunedoara County
