= Ljubica Ostojić =

Bosnian poet (1945–2021)

- Born: 20 March 1945; Belgrade, Serbia, Yugoslavia
- Died: 29 May 2021 (aged 76)

Ljubica Ostojić (20 March 1945 – 29 May 2021) was a Bosnian poet, writer and playwright from Bosnia and Herzegovina. She wrote in Croatian and taught dramaturgy at the Academy of Performing Arts in Sarajevo.

== Early life and education ==
Born in Belgrade, she moved with her parents in the same year to Sarajevo, Bosnia and Herzegovina.

She obtained an Arts degree with a major in comparative literature and theatrology from the Faculty of Philosophy in Sarajevo.

== Career ==
As a young poet, she was associated with a group of Sarajevan poets known as Sudbonosni dječaci (the 'Destined boys') developing as literary and intellectual circle around Mak Dizdar and Duško Trifunović, with other distinguished poets of her generation such as: Abdulah Sidran, Stevan Tontić, Rajko Petrov Nogo, Radovan Karadžić, Ivan Kordić, Drago Jovanović, Predrag Finci etc.

Ljubica Ostojić worked as a dramaturg at the Youth Theatre in Sarajevo. She was a professional writer, playwright and long-time theatrical critic for local newspapers and specialised journals, such as Odjek or Književna revija, and from 1994 lectured at the Academy of Performing Arts in Sarajevo where she held the title of Professor.

Ljubica Ostojić wrote scripts for dramas on radio and TV, critical and essay texts on theatre, literature and visual arts. She has also adapted numerous texts for performance in the theatre.

Her poems and texts have been translated into English, Albanian, German, Macedonian, French, Slovene, Turkish, Polish, Czech, Slovak, Greek, and Hungarian.

== Awards and memberships ==
She was a member of the Association of Writers of Bosnia and Herzegovina from 1974 and PEN Club of Bosnia and Herzegovina from 2007.

In addition, she earned several awards throughout her career, including:

- The award of the publisher Svjetlost for the best book of 1974.
- The award of the publisher Veselin Masleša for the best book of 1985.
- The award "Luka Pavlović" from the Association of Theatrical Critics and Theatrologists of Bosnia-Herzegovina for 1990–91.
- The award "Golden Brooch" for culture by the weekly magazine Žena for 1998.
- The international award "Grozdanin kikot" – for her contribution to the development of drama education in 2000.
- The Golden Laurel Wreath for her contribution to the art of theater, given by the MESS festival in 2012.

== Selected works ==
=== Poetry ===
- Vrijeme za Ukras (The Time for Adornment) Svjetlost: Sarajevo 1969 (as Ljubica Ostojić-Finci).
- Ispod Drvlja I Kamenja (Under the Timbers and Stones) Svjetlost: Sarajevo 1973.
- Morska Pjesmarica (Songbook of the Sea), Veselin Masleša: Sarajevo 1985.
- Smrtna Pjesmarica (Songbook of Death), Svjetlost: Sarajevo 1999.

=== Drama texts ===
- Kočoperitis izvjesne mlade dame u pubertetu (The Over-Enthusiasm of a Certain Young Lady in her Puberty) Zajednica prof. pozorišta BiH: Sarajevo 1985.
- Ružno pače (The Ugly Duckling) Zajednica prof. pozorišta BiH: Sarajevo 1991.
- Rijeka čudotvornica (The Miraculous River), in Tmača Art 45-46 (2008), pp. 102–121 (English and Croatian publications).
- Sve se nekako preživi osim smrti (One can survive everything except death) in Prst: Zbirka savremene drame 2, ed. by V. Bošković. Hartefakt Drama: Belgrade 2012, pp. 275–345.

=== Books for children and youth ===
- Tu stanuje Danijelova priča (Here Lives the Story of Danijel), Svjetlost: Sarajevo 1974.
- Dječak s ključem oko vrata (The Boy with a Key around his Neck) Veselin Masleša: Sarajevo 1986.
- Svjetlucanja (Glowings) Sarajevo Publishing: Sarajevo 2003.
- Princeza Ariel I Yo (Princess Ariel and Yo), Bosanska Riječ: Tuzla 2010.

=== Theatrical works ===
- Pour une anthologie imaginaire du théâtre contemporain en Bosnie-Herzégovine, in Revue des Études Slaves 77/1-2 (2006), pp. 67–77.
- War and Theatre, Intercultural Education (with S. Djulic) in European Journal for Intercultural Education 10/3 (1999), pp. 313–318.
