= Agi Mishol =

Israeli poet (born 1947)

- אגי משעול
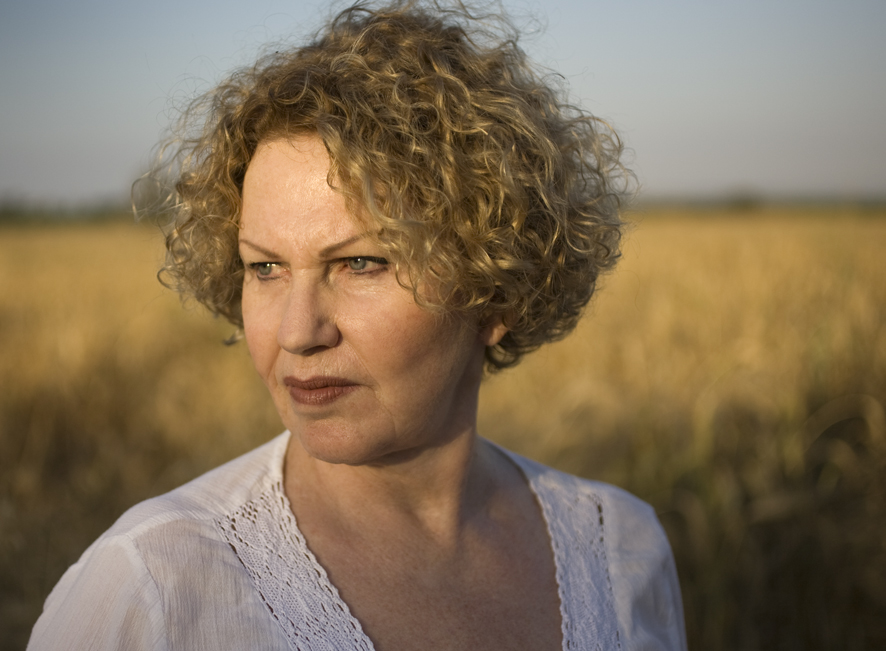
- Born: Agi Fried; October 20, 1947 (age 79); Cehu Silvaniei, Romania
- Education: Hebrew University of Jerusalem
- Writing career
- Language: Hebrew

Agi Mishol (Hebrew: אגי משעול; born October 20, 1947) is an Israeli poet. Mishol's work has been published in several languages, and has won various awards including the Zbigniew Herbert International Literary Award, the Horst Bienek Prize for Poetry and The Yehuda Amichai Prize for literature.

== Biography ==
Agi (Agnes) Fried (later Mishol) was born in Cehu Silvaniei, Transylvania, Romania, to Hungarian-speaking Jewish parents who survived the Holocaust. She was brought to Israel at the age of 4. Her parents ran a bicycle and electronics repair shop in Gedera, a small southern town. The family spoke mainly Hungarian at home. They lived in a small, one-room apartment in a housing project. Until she was drafted into the Israel Defense Forces, Mishol slept on an armchair that opened into a bed. She began writing poetry at an early age, but did poorly in school. During her military service at the nuclear facility in Dimona, she began studying literature at Ben Gurion University of the Negev. She was married briefly at 19 and a half. After her divorce, she moved to Jerusalem and did her BA and MA degrees in Hebrew literature at Hebrew University of Jerusalem, where she attended a writing workshop given by Yehuda Amichai. In Jerusalem, she met and married Giora Mishol, who was working for the Ministry of Absorption. They moved to Kfar Mordechai, a Moshav next to her hometown Gedera, where they grow peaches, persimmons and pomegranates. They have two children, Maya and Uri, seven cats and a dog.

Mishol was an educator and Hebrew literature teacher at Be'er Tuvia high school during the years 1976 to 2001. After retiring, she served as a senior lecturer at Alma College for Hebrew Culture in Tel Aviv between the years 2002 and 2008. In 2006, she was the artistic director of the International Poetry Festival, held in Mishkenot Sha'ananim, Jerusalem. From 2011 to this date, she has led the Helicon School of Poetry in Tel Aviv, where she also leads creative writing workshops. Mishol has lectured and taught creative writing at Ben Gurion University, Tel Aviv University, and the Hebrew University in Jerusalem, where she also served as Poet-in-Residence (2007).

In 2018, Mishol's personal literary archive, including manuscripts, drafts, photographs, letters and diaries were moved to the National Library of Israel in Jerusalem.

== Literary Career ==
Mishol is the author of 20 volumes of poetry, including two comprehensive selections encompassing different periods in her career. She self-published her first book, "Kodem Tafasti Rega," when she was 18 years old, but then recollected all copies in the bookshops and destroyed them. Her latest published book is "שירים זה מכשפות" (Poems. It's witches, Hakibutz Hameuhad). Her volume "Selected and New Poems" (2003, Hakibutz Hameuhad and Bialik Institute) has sold over 13,000 copies to date. Mishol's poems are widely popular in Israel, have been set to music by various Israeli artists, including Corinne Allal, Yehudit Ravitz, and Ori Leshman, and adapted into theatrical works such as "Yanshufot" (Owls, 2004). Translated selections of her poems have been published in the US, Germany, the UK, Ireland, France, Italy, Argentina, Romania, and Slovenia.

In 2022, Mishol served as Poet in Residence in the Israel Institute for Advanced Studies in the Hebrew University of Jerusalem, where she is also a member of the university's board of trustees. She appeared extensively in various international events, and in 2006 was the artistic director of the international poetry festival in Mishkanot Sha'ananim, Jerusalem. Mishol managed the Helicon School of Poetry between the years 2011 and 2014, and has taught poetry and led writing workshops in various academic institutions in Israel.

As recognition of her work, Mishol holds three PhD honoris causa titles, from the Weizmann Institute, Tel Aviv University, and Bar-Ilan university. In 2018, her literary archive was deposited in the National Library of Israel's archive, in Jerusalem.

== Themes ==
According to Haim Gouri, Agi Mishol has a broad poetic spectrum: "All flora and fauna near and far, varied and colorful landscapes, love and romance, powerful eroticism, revealing and concealing, being the only child of Holocaust survivors who personally experienced the worst...It is poetry filled with rich metaphors and ongoing observation of the human condition."

In his introduction to "Selected and New Poems", Prof. Dan Miron wrote: "Agi Mishol is a poet now standing at the height of her strength... Agi Mishol undoubtedly belongs to the great dynasty of female Hebrew poets – Rachel Bluwstein, Yocheved Bat-Miriam, Lea Goldberg, Dalia Rabikovitch, and Yona Wallach.

In his book review in The New York Times of Look There (2006), Joel Brouwer wrote: "Mishol... takes up political subjects with a sly delicacy reminiscent of the Polish poet Wislawa Szymborska's best work".

According to Amos Oz, "Agi Mishol's poems know how to tell a tale, to sing a song, and also dance – all at the same time. I love the splendid surprises in them, the subtle and exact sadness, and the mysterious manner by which she makes this sadness overflow with hidden joy."

In 2006, Naomi Shihab Nye wrote: "Agi Mishol's poems feel perfectly weighted. Her mix of honest empathy and care and elegant wit is deeply touching and enlivening."

== Awards and recognition ==
- In 2025, Mishol was awarded the Coburg Rückert Prize, named after German poet and translator Friedrich Rückert, and awarded every three years. Mishol shared the award with Anne Birkenhauer, who translated her book Gedicht für den unvollkommenen Menschen, published by Hanser Literaturverlag.
- In 2024, Mishol was awarded the Horst Bienek Prize for Poetry from the Bavarian Academy of Fine Arts, as recognition for her entire body of work.
- In 2020, Mishol joined the Israel Institute for Advanced Studies as an Artist in Residence.
- In March 2019, Mishol was awarded the Zbigniew Herbert International Literary Award. Members of award jury included Yuri Andrukhovych (Ukraine), Edward Hirsch (USA), Michael Krüger (Germany), Mercedes Montana (Spain), and Tomasz Różycki (Poland).
- In 2018, Mishol won the Newman Prize for Lifetime Achievement in the field of literature.
- In 2018, Mishol received a (third) honorary doctorate, from Bar Ilan University, "for her lyrical poetry, which reveals the story of Israel and its people from her personal perspective as the child of Holocaust survivors".
- In 2017, Mishol's personal literary archive was deposited in the National Library of Israel.
- In 2016, Mishol received a (second) PHD Honoris Causa from the Weizmann Institute of Science. According to Weizmann Institute's website, "Her writing forges a rare balance between literal and poetic precision and accessibility to the readers, combining everyday language and slang with inventive linguistics. Infused with irony and humor, hers are very personal poems, which, at the same time, provide extensive human insight.".
- In 2014, Mishol received the Italian Lericipea award, previously awarded to Seamus Heaney, Adunis and Yevgeny Yevtushenko.
- In 2014, Mishol was awarded an honorary doctorate (Doctor Philosophiae Honoris Causa) by Tel Aviv University, "in recognition of her standing as one of Israel's most prominent and best-loved poets [and] her immense contribution to enriching Israeli culture".
- In 2007, Mishol received the Dolitsky prize for literature.
- In 2002, Mishol received the Yehuda Amichai Prize.
- In 2000, Mishol won the Kugel literary award.
- In 1995, Mishol won the Israeli Prime Minister Prize.

== Published works in Hebrew ==
- Domestic Angel, Mossad Bialik & Hakibbutz Hameuchad, 2015 [Mal'ach Hacheder]
- Awake, Hakibbutz Hameuhad, 2013 [Era]
- Working Order, Hakibbutz Hameuhad, 2011 [Sidur Avoda]
- House Call, Hakibbutz Hameuhad, 2009 [Bikur Bait]
- Things Happen, Hakibbutz Hameuhad & Mossad Bialik, 2005 [Korim Dvarim]
- Moment, Hakibbutz Hameuchad, 2005
- Selected and New Poems, Mossad Bialik & Hakibbutz Hameuchad, 2003 [Mivchar Ve-Chadashim]
- Wax Flower, Even Hoshen, 2002 [Nerot Netz Ha-Chalav]
- Dream Notebook, Even Hoshen, 2000 [Machberet Ha-Chalomot]
- Look There, Helikon-Tag, 1999 [Re'eh Sham]
- See (edited by Nathan Zach), Helikon-Tag, 1997 [Hineh]
- The Interior Plain, Hakibbutz Hameuchad, 1995 [Ha-Shfela Ha-Pnimit]
- Fax Pigeon, Hakibbutz Hameuchad, 1991 [Yonat Faximilia]
- Plantation Notes, Keter, 1987 [Yoman Mata]
- Gallop, Hakibbutz Hameuchad, 1980 [Gallop]
- A Cat's Scratch, Hakibbutz Hameuchad, 1978 [Srita Shel Hatul]
- Nanny and Both of Us, Ekked, 1972 [Nanny Ve-Shneinu]
- I Caught a Moment, Golan, 1967 [Kodem Tafasti Rega]

== Translations ==
- Gedicht für den unvollkommenen Menschen (translated by Anne Birkenhauer), Hanser Literaturverlag, 2024, ISBN 978-3446281271.
- Jestem stąd, Wydawnictwo a5, 2020, ISBN 978-83-65614-30-8
- Čipka na železu, (translated by Klemen Jelinčič Boeta), Beletrina, 2018
- Ricami su ferro (translated by Anna Linda Callow & Kozimo Coen), Giuntina, 2017, ISBN 978-8880576846
- Less Like a Dove (translated by Joanna Chen), Shearsman Books, 2016, ISBN 978-1848614765
- Ropa Tendida (Agui Mishol), Poesía Mayor/leviatán, 2013, ISBN 978-987-514-260-2
- Fraza magazine, 2011, Interview and translations to Polish
- The ECCO Anthology of International Poetry, edited by Ilya Kaminsky and Susan Harris, 2010, ECCO
- Journal du verger (translated by Emmanuel Moses & Esther Orner), Caractères, 2008, ISBN 978-2-85446-425-2
- Şeherezada (translated by Riri Sylvia Manor & Ioana Ieronim), Institutul Cultural Român, 2008, ISBN 978-973-577-563-6
- Look There: New and Selected Poems of Agi Mishol (translated by Lisa Katz), Graywolf Press, 2006, ISBN 1-55597436-8
- The Swimmers, Poetry Ireland and the Tyrone Guthrie Centre, 1998, ISBN 1-902121-17-1
