= Băsești =

- Commune
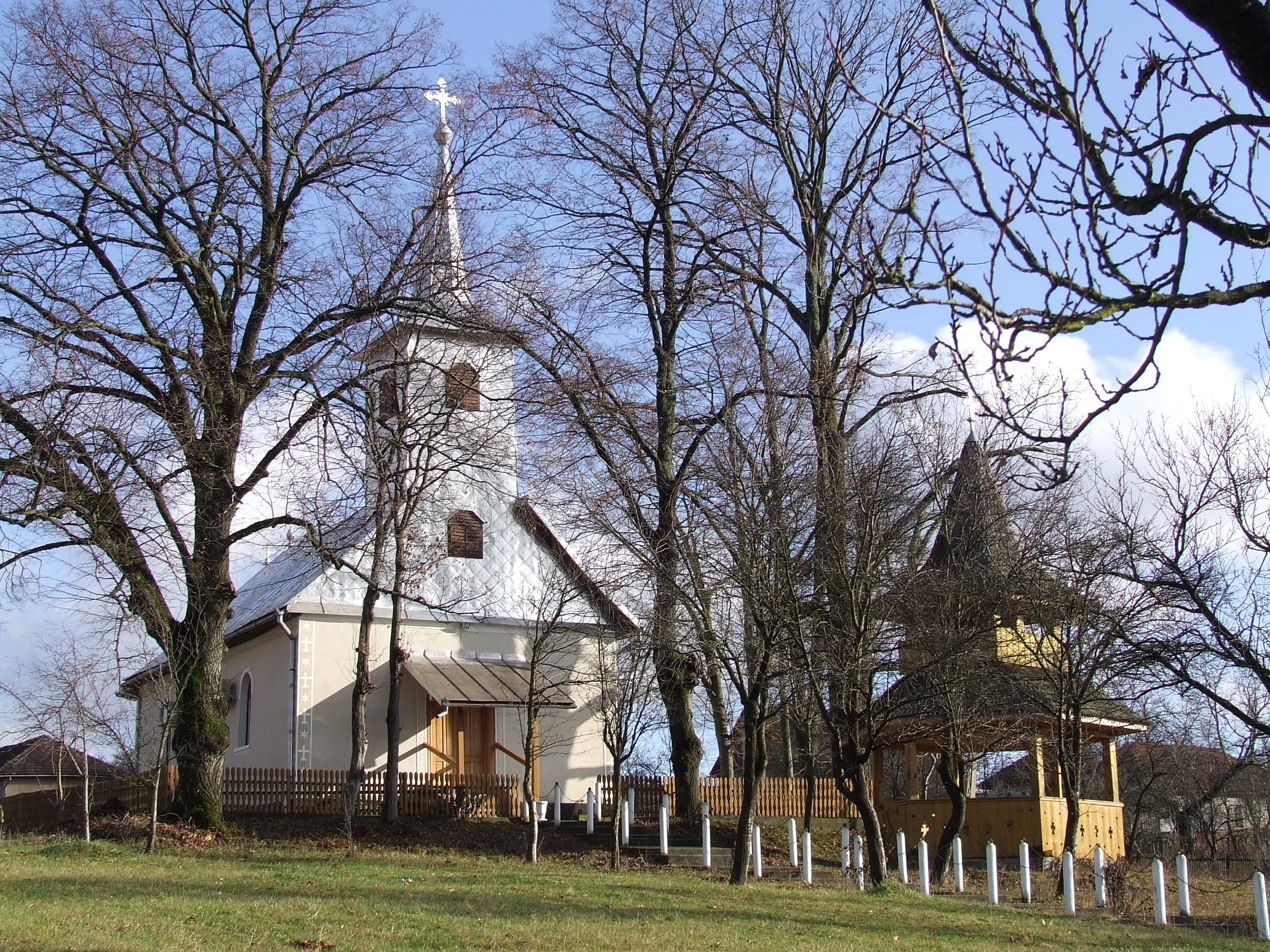
- Wooden church of the Archangels in Săliște

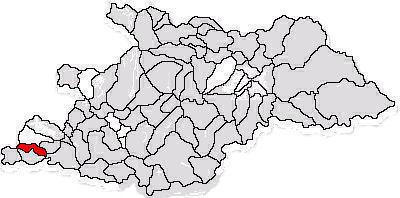
- Location in Maramureș County

- Location in Romania
- Coordinates: 47°28′50″N 23°08′46″E
- Country: Romania
- County: Maramureș

Government
  - Mayor (2024–2028): Ioan Călăuz (PNL)
- Elevation: 188 m (617 ft)
- Population (2021-12-01): 1,288
- Time zone: UTC+02:00 (EET)
  - Summer (DST): UTC+03:00 (EEST)
- Postal code: 437030
- Area code: +40 x59
- Vehicle reg.: MM
- Website: basestimm.ro

Băsești (Hungarian: Szilágyillésfalva) is a commune in Maramureș County, Crișana, Romania. It is composed of four villages: Băsești, Odești (Vadafalva), Săliște (Kecskésfalva), and Stremț (Bükktótfalu).

== Geography ==
The commune is located at the extreme southwest of Maramureș County, at a distance of about 50 km (31 mi) from the county seat, Baia Mare, on the border with both Sălaj and Satu Mare counties. It lies at an altitude of 188 m (617 ft), on the banks of the rivers Băsești and Tămășești. The closest train station is in Ariniș commune, 10 km (6.2 mi) away.

== Sights ==
- Wooden Church in Odești, built in the 19th century (1832)
- Wooden Church in Săliște, built in the 20th century (1902)
- Gheorghe Pop de Băsești Memorial House

Historical population
Year	Pop.	±%
1880	2,442	—
1900	2,665	+9.1%
1910	2,847	+6.8%
1930	2,993	+5.1%
1956	3,087	+3.1%
1977	2,675	−13.3%
1992	1,880	−29.7%
2002	1,608	−14.5%
2011	1,452	−9.7%
2021	1,288	−11.3%
Source: Census data

== Notable people ==
- Gheorghe Pop de Băsești (1835–1919), Austro-Hungarian and Romanian politician
- Elena Pop-Hossu-Longin (1862–1940), Austro-Hungarian and Romanian writer, journalist and women's rights activist
- Vasile Marinca (born 1951), mathematician, corresponding member of the Romanian Academy
- Decebal Traian Remeș (1949–2020), politician
