= Gârdani =

- Commune
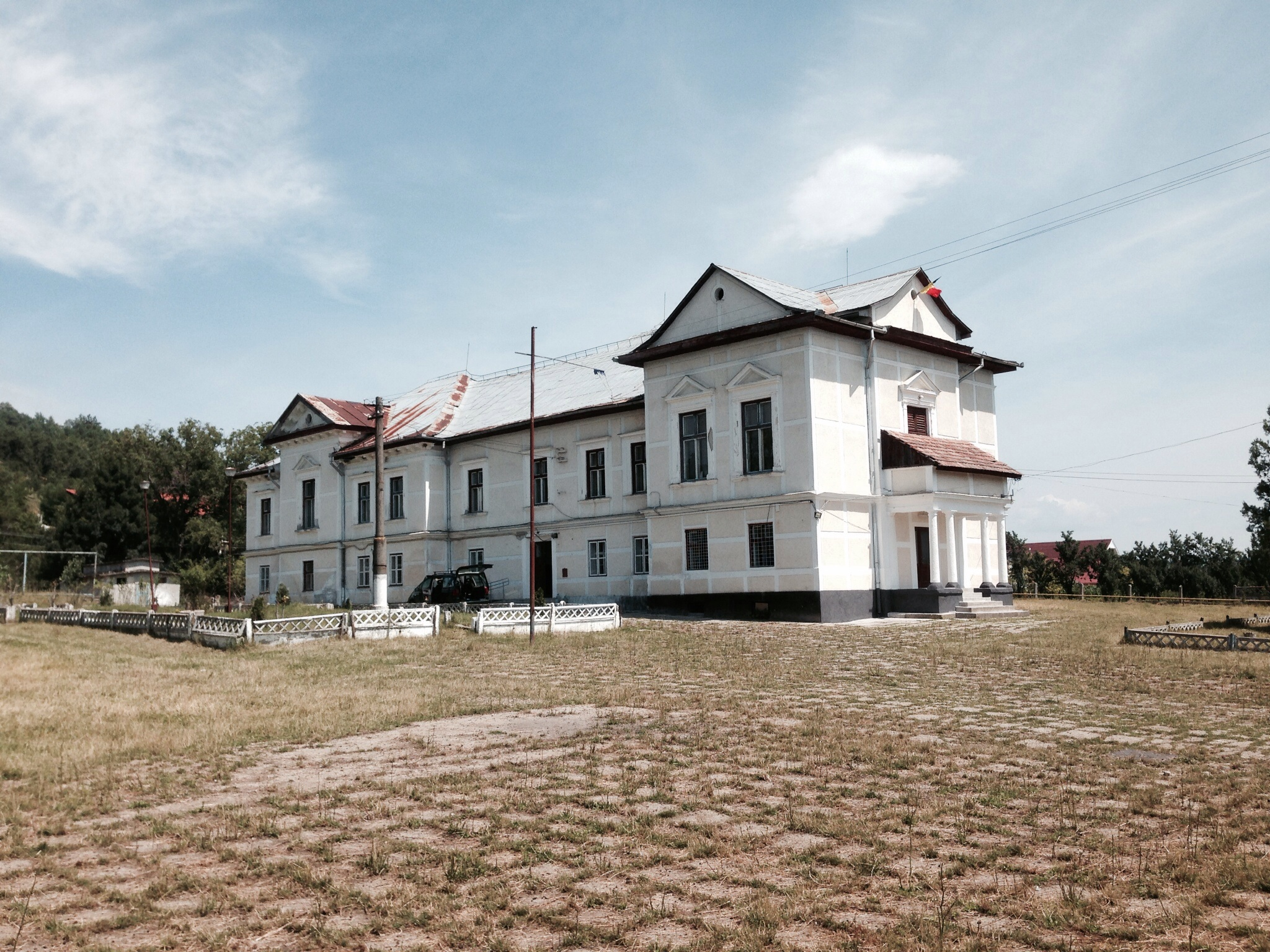
- Blomberg Palace in Gârdani

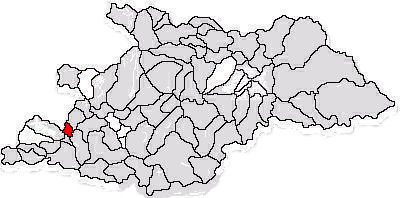
- Location in Maramureș County

- Location in Romania
- Coordinates: 47°33′N 23°19′E
- Country: Romania
- County: Maramureș

Government
  - Mayor (2024–2028): Nelu-Radu Dragoș (PSD)
- Area: 18.61 km^{2} (7.19 sq mi)
- Elevation: 160 m (520 ft)
- Population (2021-12-01): 1,311
  - Density: 70.45/km^{2} (182.5/sq mi)
- Time zone: UTC+02:00 (EET)
  - Summer (DST): UTC+03:00 (EEST)
- Postal code: 437301
- Area code: (+40) 0262
- Vehicle reg.: MM
- Website: primariagardani.ro

Gârdani (Hungarian: Gardánfalva) is a commune in Maramureș County, Crișana, Romania. It is composed of a single village, Gârdani, part of Sălsig Commune until being split off in 2004.

The commune is located in the western part of the county, on the border with Satu Mare County. It lies on the right bank of the river Someș, at a distance of 33 km (21 mi) from the county seat, Baia Mare

Historical population
Year	Pop.	±%
1880	710	—
1900	878	+23.7%
1910	946	+7.7%
1930	1,005	+6.2%
1956	1,349	+34.2%
1977	1,800	+33.4%
1992	1,671	−7.2%
2002	1,632	−2.3%
2011	1,151	−29.5%
2021	1,311	+13.9%
Source: Census data

At the 2011 census, Gârdani had a population of 1,151; of those, 96% were ethnic Romanians. At the 2021 census, the population had increased to 1,311, of which 92% were Romanians.
