= Sălsig =

- Commune
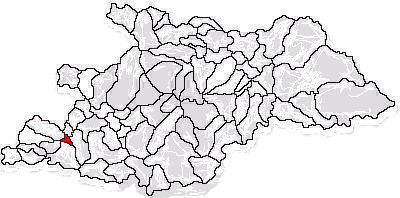
- Location in Maramureș County

- Location in Romania
- Coordinates: 47°31′N 23°18′E
- Country: Romania
- County: Maramureș

Government
  - Mayor (2020–2024): Daniel Pop (PMP)
- Area: 22.12 km^{2} (8.54 sq mi)
- Elevation: 160 m (520 ft)
- Population (2021-12-01): 1,663
  - Density: 75.18/km^{2} (194.7/sq mi)
- Time zone: UTC+02:00 (EET)
  - Summer (DST): UTC+03:00 (EEST)
- Postal code: 437300
- Area code: +40 x59
- Vehicle reg.: MM
- Website: www.salsig.ro

Sălsig (Hungarian: Szélszeg) is a commune in Maramureș County, Crișana, Romania. It is composed of a single village, Sălsig. It also included Gârdani village until 2004, when it was split off to form a separate commune.

The commune is located in the southwestern part of Maramureș County, 36 km (22 mi) from the county seat, Baia Mare. It lies on the banks of the river Someș and its left tributary, the river Sălaj.

Historical population
Year	Pop.	±%
2002	1,544	—
2011	1,641	+6.3%
2021	1,663	+1.3%
Source: Census data
