= Oarța =

- Location within Romania

Location
- Country: Romania
- Counties: Maramureș County
- Villages: Oarța de Sus, Orțița, Oarța de Jos

Physical characteristics
- Source: Asuaju Hills
- Mouth: Sălaj
  - coordinates: 47.4540°N 23.1751°E
- Length: 12 km (7.5 mi)
- Basin size: 31 km^{2} (12 sq mi)

Basin features
- Progression: Sălaj→ Someș→ Tisza→ Danube→ Black Sea
- Tributaries
  - right: Stânjaru

The Oarța is a left tributary of the river Sălaj in Romania. It flows into the Sălaj near Oarța de Jos. Its length is 12 km (7.5 mi) and its basin size is 31 km^{2} (12 sq mi).
