= Horst Bienek Prize for Poetry =

- Native name: Horst-Bienek-Preis für Lyrik
- Description: German literary prize for poetry
- Country: Germany
- Presented by: Bavarian Academy of Fine Arts
- Website: https://www.badsk.de/preise/horst-bienek-preis-für-lyrik

The Horst Bienek Prize for Poetry (Horst-Bienek-Preis für Lyrik) is a German literary prize named after novelist and poet Horst Bienek. It was established in 1991 and is awarded by the Bavarian Academy of Fine Arts. It is awarded every two years.

== Recipients ==
- 1991: John Ashbery, Förderpreis: Journal of Literature Neue Sirene
- 1992: Tomas Tranströmer, Förderpreis: Manfred Peter Hein
- 1993: Robert Creeley and Walter Höllerer
- 1994: Seamus Heaney
- 1995: Johannes Kühn, Förderpreis: Heiderhoff Verlag
- 1996: Ronald Stuart Thomas, Förderpreis: Kevin Perryman
- 1997: Oskar Pastior, Förderpreis: Toni Pongratz
- 1998: Inger Christensen, Förderpreis: Marcel Beyer
- 1999: Wulf Kirsten, Förderpreis: Amanda Aizpuriete
- 2000: Philippe Jaccottet, Förderpreis: Stevan Tontić
- 2001: Michael Hamburger
- 2002: Adam Zagajewski, Förderpreis: Urs Engeler
- 2003: Charles Simic, Förderpreis: Bernhard Albers
- 2004: no award
- 2005: Alfred Kolleritsch, Förderpreis: Anja Utler
- 2007: Yves Bonnefoy, Friedhelm Kemp; Förderpreis: Kookbooks-Verlegerin Daniela Seel
- 2009: Dagmar Nick; Prize for cultural mediation: Lyrik Kabinett
- 2010: Friederike Mayröcker for the complete works
- 2012: Elisabeth Borchers for the complete works
- 2014: Geoffrey Hill, Förderpreise: Tadeusz Dąbrowski und Daniel Pietrek
- 2016: Aleš Šteger, Förderpreis: Margitt Lehbert
- 2018: Cees Nooteboom, Förderpreis: Raphael Urweider
- 2020: no award
- 2022: Judith Herzberg, Förderpreis: Ronya Othmann
- 2024: Agi Mishol, Förderpreis: Ana Pepelnik
