= Francisc Hossu-Longin =

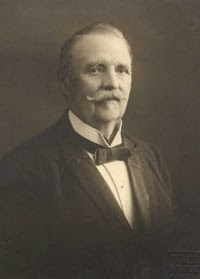
Francisc Hossu-Longin

Francisc Hossu-Longin (October 2, 1847 – February 12, 1935) was an Imperial Austrian-born Romanian lawyer and memoirist.

== Biography ==
=== Origins and career ===
Born in Zam, Hunedoara County, in the Transylvania region, his parents were Mihai Lupu Hossu, a clerk, and his wife Luiza or Aloisa (née Pandak). The family was Greek-Catholic. He attended primary school in Deva, Orăștie and Beiuș, followed by high school in Beiuș, Alba Iulia, Cluj and Orăștie.

From 1868 to 1872, he studied law at the Faculty of Law of the Royal University of Pest, after which he settled in Deva as a lawyer. While a student, he belonged to the Petru Maior Society, and was also a member of Astra. In 1882, he married Elena Pop, the daughter of Gheorghe Pop de Băsești. Belonging to the leadership committee of the Romanian National Party (PNR), Hossu-Longin was defense attorney during the Transylvanian Memorandum trial. He was editor at Familia and Gura satului magazines, where he also published literary or general interest materials, sometimes signing as Letiția. In addition, he contributed to Calicul, Gazeta ilustrată, Gazeta Transilvaniei and Transilvania.

=== 1909 trial ===
His writing sparked a number of political trials against Hossu-Longin: while he was contributing to Gura satului, he received a one-month prison sentence, served at Vác; in the autumn of 1877, he was again tried for his support for Romania's War of Independence. His most ample legal trouble came as a result of "Mea culpa", an article he published in Gazeta Transilvaniei in December 1908. There, he urged the PNR leaders to focus more closely on the peasantry, with whom he felt they had lost touch. He accused them of deliberately neglecting the lower classes and allowing them to face the abusive measures of the Hungarian Kingdom's authorities while safeguarding their own position. In conclusion, he urged the elite to change its attitude from verbal promises to facts, from accommodation to principled stands, from illusion to clear-sightedness, from the appearance of a struggle to a genuine one.

While the Romanian-language press apparently did not react to the article, the tribunal at Târgu Mureș indicted him for press agitation four months later. He was also accused of incitement to hatred against the Hungarian nation, and several weeks after the indictment was issued, published a lawyerly response to the charges. There, he attempted to show that the authorities consistently targeted Romanian journalists as "Vlach irredentists", while Hungarian-language newspapers promoting a similar language against Romanian ethnics were left alone. The trial began in December 1909; it drew interest both because the accused was a prominent lawyer and because of the judge's identity. While still a prosecutor, the presiding judge, Lázár Miklós, had labeled 1848 revolutionary Avram Iancu as a "captain of bandits". Hossu-Longin did not hire a lawyer, and the jury of twelve was drawn from the small-scale Székely bourgeoisie.

Miklós began by questioning Hossu-Longin about his motives; the latter's firm reply rattled the judge, who violated established procedure by introducing a new charge of insulting the Hungarian judiciary. The accused refused to answer, and the prosecutor then launched into an hour-long speech detailing the Hungarian view of Transylvanian history and the government's generosity toward the Romanian community. Hossu-Longin refused to take the stand in his defense, and was found guilty after five minutes of deliberations. He was sentenced to a year in prison and a fine of 1000 krone. The penalty drew condemnation in the Romanian press, and was also decried by sociologist Oszkár Jászi.

=== Later years ===
He continued writing until the eve of World War I, and was a participant at the 1918 assembly that ratified the union of Transylvania with Romania. Somewhat embittered with the ensuing atmosphere, he withdrew from public life.

In old age, Hossu-Longin wrote his memoirs, Amintiri din viața mea, which he donated to the Central University Library of Cluj and were published posthumously in 1975. Written without literary pretensions but with a flair for authenticity, they recount the habits and typical events of Transylvanian life during the late 19th century, and represent an interesting historical document.
