= Reformed Church, Cehu Silvaniei =

Church in Sălaj County, Romania

Coordinates: 47.41196°N 23.17759°E

Reformed Church
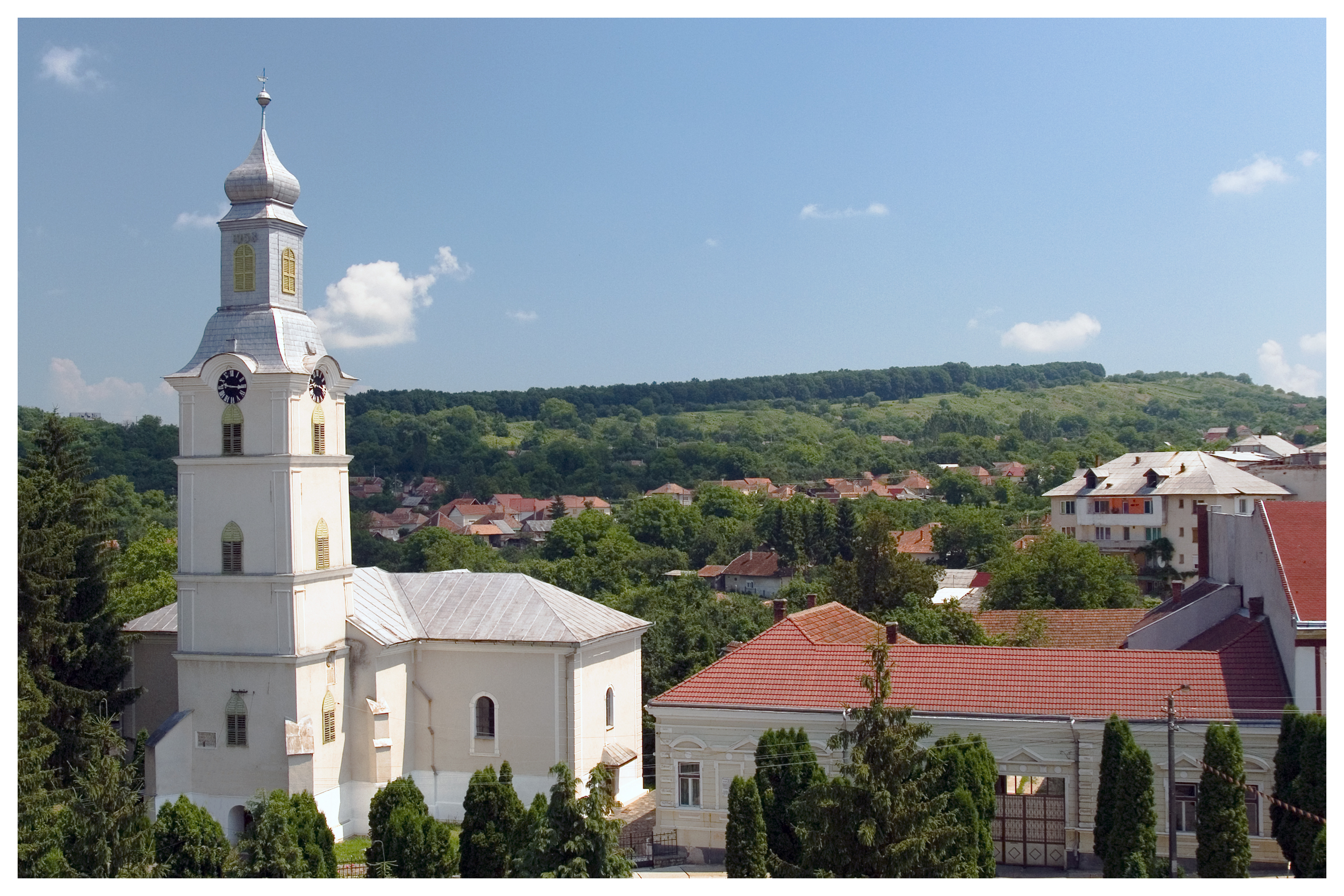

Religion
- Affiliation: Reformed Church in Romania
- Year consecrated: 1604

Location
- Municipality: Cehu Silvaniei
- Interactive map of Reformed Church

The Reformed Church (Romanian: Biserica Reformată; Hungarian: Református templom) is a church in Cehu Silvaniei, Romania, rebuilt up until 1604.
