= Stevan Tontić =

Serbian writer and translator (1946–2022)

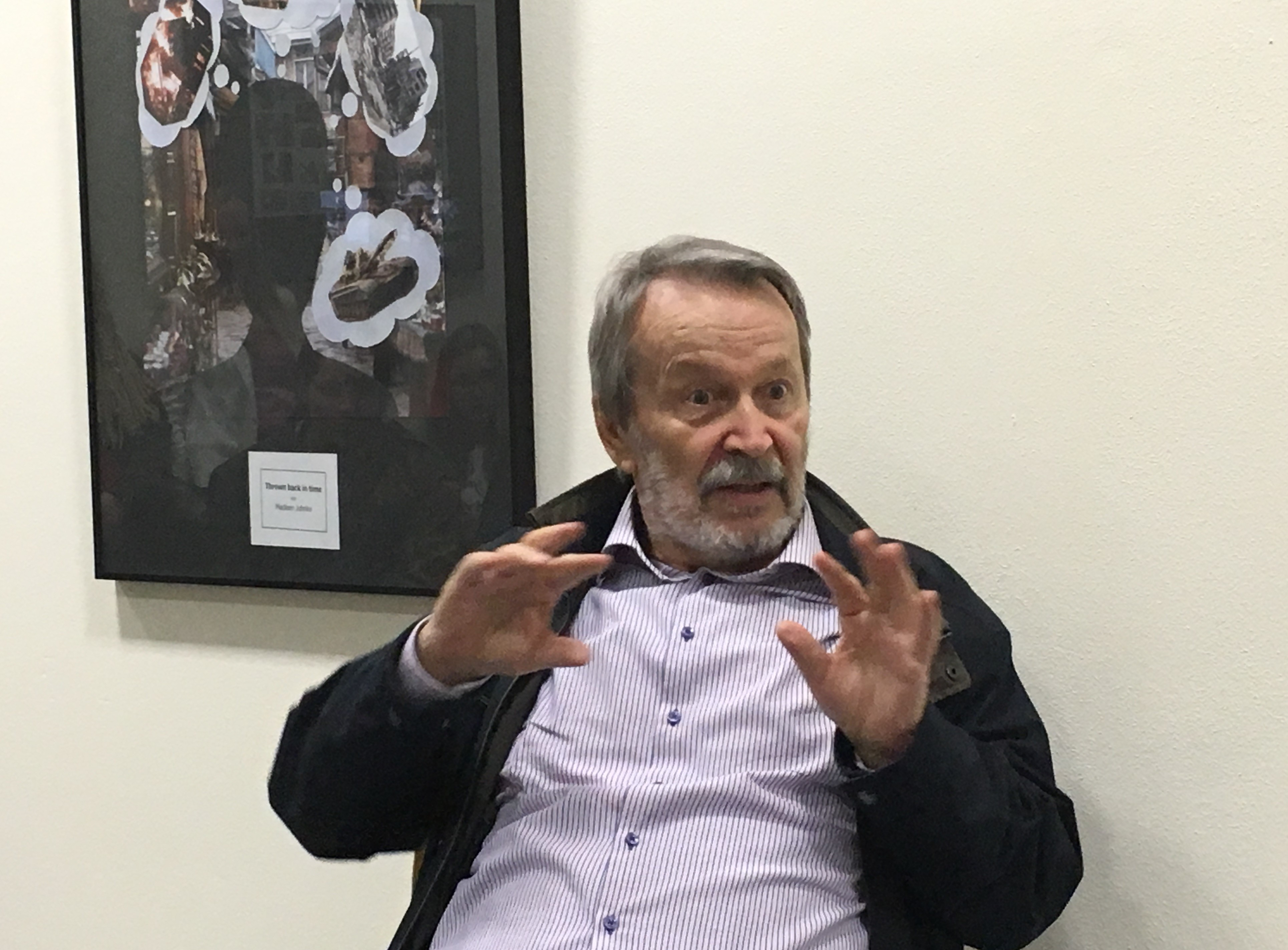
- Tontć in 2019
- Born: 30 December 1946; Sanski Most, PR Bosnia and Herzegovina, FPR Yugoslavia
- Died: 12 February 2022 (aged 75)
- Occupations: Writer; Translator

Stevan Tontić (30 December 1946 – 12 February 2022) was a Serbian writer and translator.

== Biography ==
Tontić studied philosophy and sociology in Sarajevo, where he later lived and worked as an editor. After the Siege of Sarajevo in 1992, he stayed in exile in Germany until his return in 2001. In his works, he often wrote about the collapse of southern Slavic civilizations. He also dealt with his experiences of war and exile.

He died on 12 February 2022, at the age of 75.

== Works ==
- Handschrift aus Sarajevo (1998)
- Sonntag in Berlin (2000)
- Im Auftrag des Wortes. Texte aus dem Exil (2004)
- Der tägliche Weltuntergang (2015)

His literary work is a part of common heritage of Serbs, Croats, Montenegrins and Bosniaks.

== Awards ==
- Horst Bienek Prize for Poetry (2000)
- Hilde-Domin-Preis für Literatur im Exil (2001)
- Heidelberg-Preis of the Bayerische Akademie der Schönen Künste (2012)
- Reiner Kunze Award (2019)
