= Tămășești (Sălaj) =

Romanian river

- Location within Romania

Location
- Country: Romania
- Counties: Maramureș County
- Villages: Odești, Tămășești

Physical characteristics
- Source: Asuaju Hills
- Mouth: Sălaj
  - coordinates: 47.4910°N 23.2316°E
- Length: 16 km (9.9 mi)
- Basin size: 33 km^{2} (13 sq mi)

Basin features
- Progression: Sălaj→ Someș→ Tisza→ Danube→ Black Sea

The Tămășești is a left tributary of the river Sălaj in Romania. It flows into the Sălaj near Ariniș. Its length is 16 km (9.9 mi) and its basin size is 33 km^{2} (13 sq mi).
