= Elena Pop-Hossu-Longin =

Writer and activist (1862-1940)

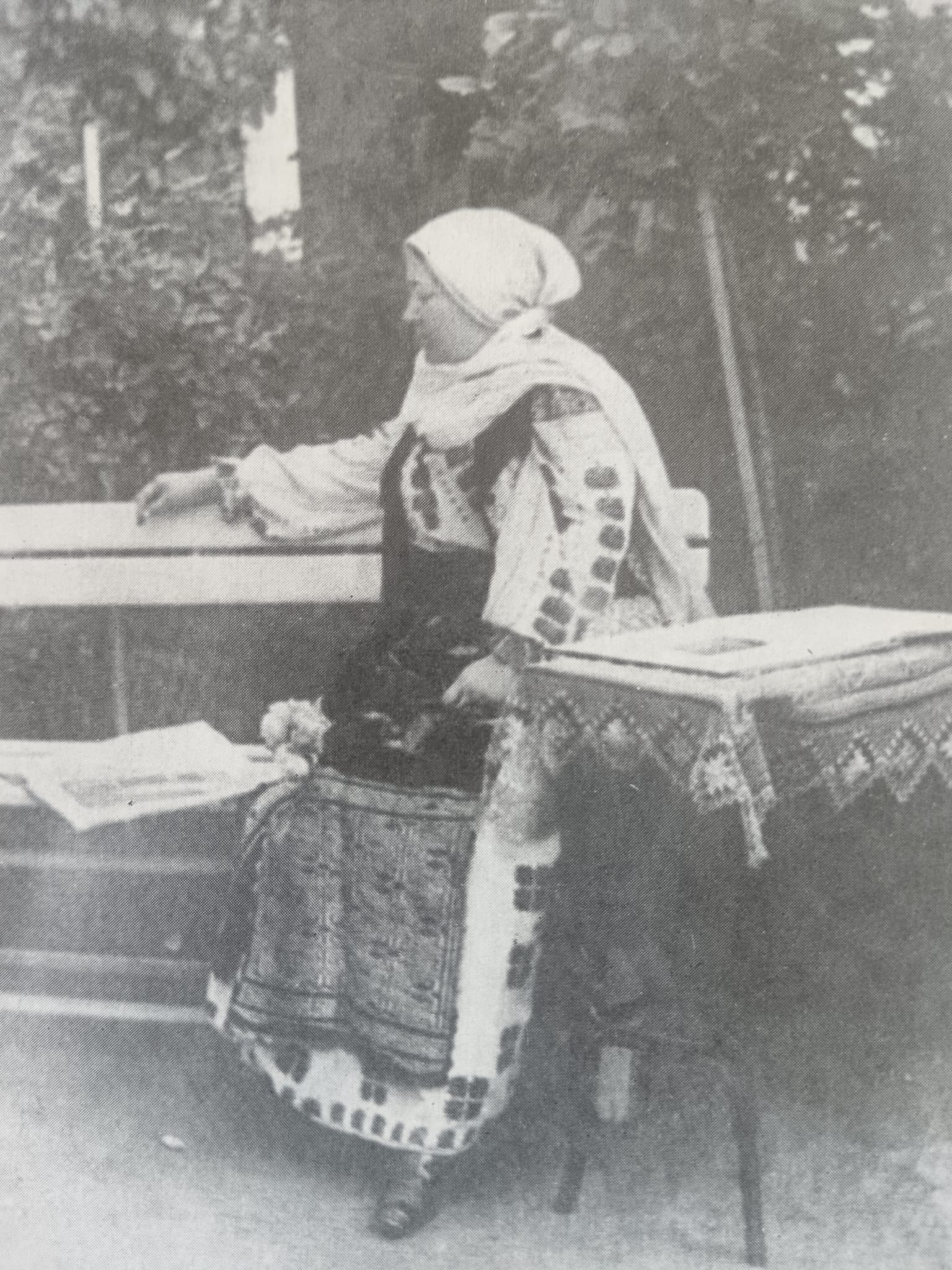
Elena Pop Hossu-Longin

Elena Pop-Hossu-Longin (26 November 1862 – 15 May 1940) was an Austro-Hungarian-born Romanian writer, journalist, socialist, suffragist and women's rights activist.

== Biography ==
Elena Pop was born in Szilágyillésfalva (Băsești) (Szilágy County, Austria-Hungary) in the family of Maria Loșonți and the politician, Gheorghe Pop de Băsești.

In 1882, she married lawyer Francisc Hossu-Longin.

Pop-Hossu-Longin was a leading figure of the Romanian women's movement and engaged in the struggle for equal rights between men and women, particularly in regards to education. She was co-founder of Reuniunea Femeilor Române Sălăjene (Union of Romanian Women of Sălaj) in 1880, co-founder of Reuniunea Femeilor Române Hunedorene (Union of Romanian Women of Hunedoara) in 1886 and its president from 1895 to 1918.

== Awards ==
- 1879, received the Decoration of the Cross of Queen Elisabeth in recognition for the fundraising she carried out for the soldiers wounded in the Romanian War of Independence.
