= Băsești (river) =

- Location within Romania

Location
- Country: Romania
- Counties: Maramureș County
- Villages: Stremț, Băsești

Physical characteristics
- Source: Asuaju Hills
- Mouth: Sălaj
  - coordinates: 47.4614°N 23.1870°E
- Length: 12 km (7.5 mi)
- Basin size: 26 km^{2} (10 sq mi)

Basin features
- Progression: Sălaj→ Someș→ Tisza→ Danube→ Black Sea

The Băsești is a left tributary of the river Sălaj in Romania. It flows into the Sălaj near the village Băsești. Its length is 12 km (7.5 mi) and its basin size is 26 km^{2} (10 sq mi).
