= Sălățig =

Sălățig Szilágyszeg
- Commune
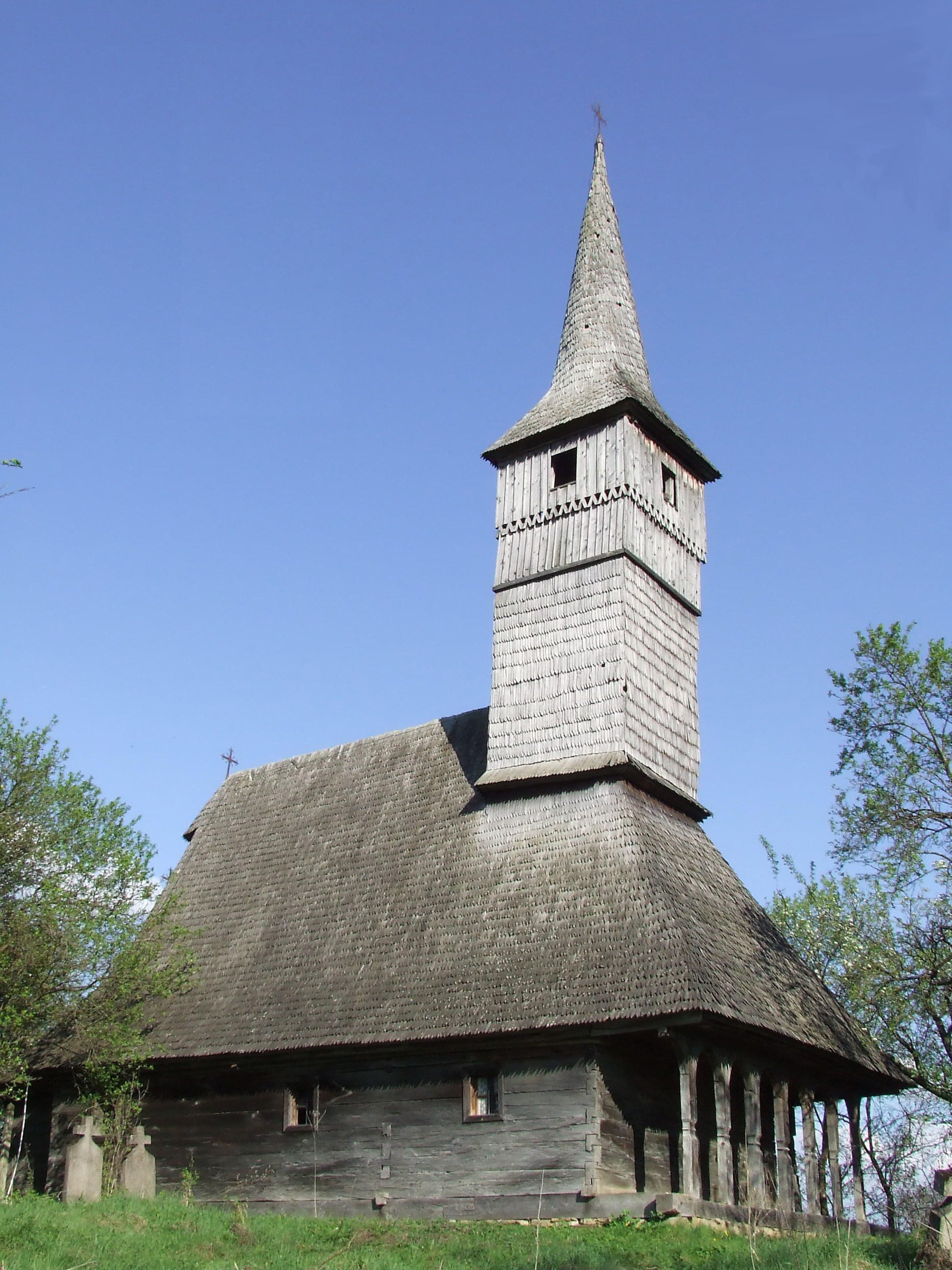
- Wooden Church in Noţig

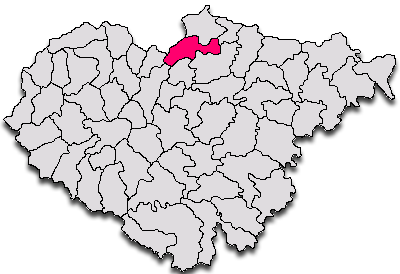
- Location in Sălaj County

- Location in Romania
- Coordinates: 47°21′58″N 23°08′24″E
- Country: Romania
- County: Sălaj

Government
  - Mayor (2020–2024): Andrei Petkeș (UDMR)
- Area: 57.91 km^{2} (22.36 sq mi)
- Elevation: 203 m (666 ft)
- Population (2021-12-01): 2,404
  - Density: 41.51/km^{2} (107.5/sq mi)
- Time zone: UTC+02:00 (EET)
  - Summer (DST): UTC+03:00 (EEST)
- Postal code: 457295
- Area code: +(40) 0260
- Vehicle reg.: SJ
- Website: comunasalatig.ro

Sălățig is a commune located in Sălaj County, Crișana, Romania. It is composed of five villages: Bulgari (Nyírfalva), Deja (Désháza), Mineu (Menyő), Noțig (Nagyszeg), and Sălățig.

== Sights ==
- Wooden Church in Bulgari, built in the 16th century (1547), historic monument
- Wooden Church in Noțig, built in the 19th century (1842), historic monument
- Reformed Church in Mineu, built in the 16th century (1514), historic monument
- Reformed Church in Sălățig, built in the 18th century (1753)
- Reformed Church in Deja, built in the 19th century (1841)

== Image Gallery ==
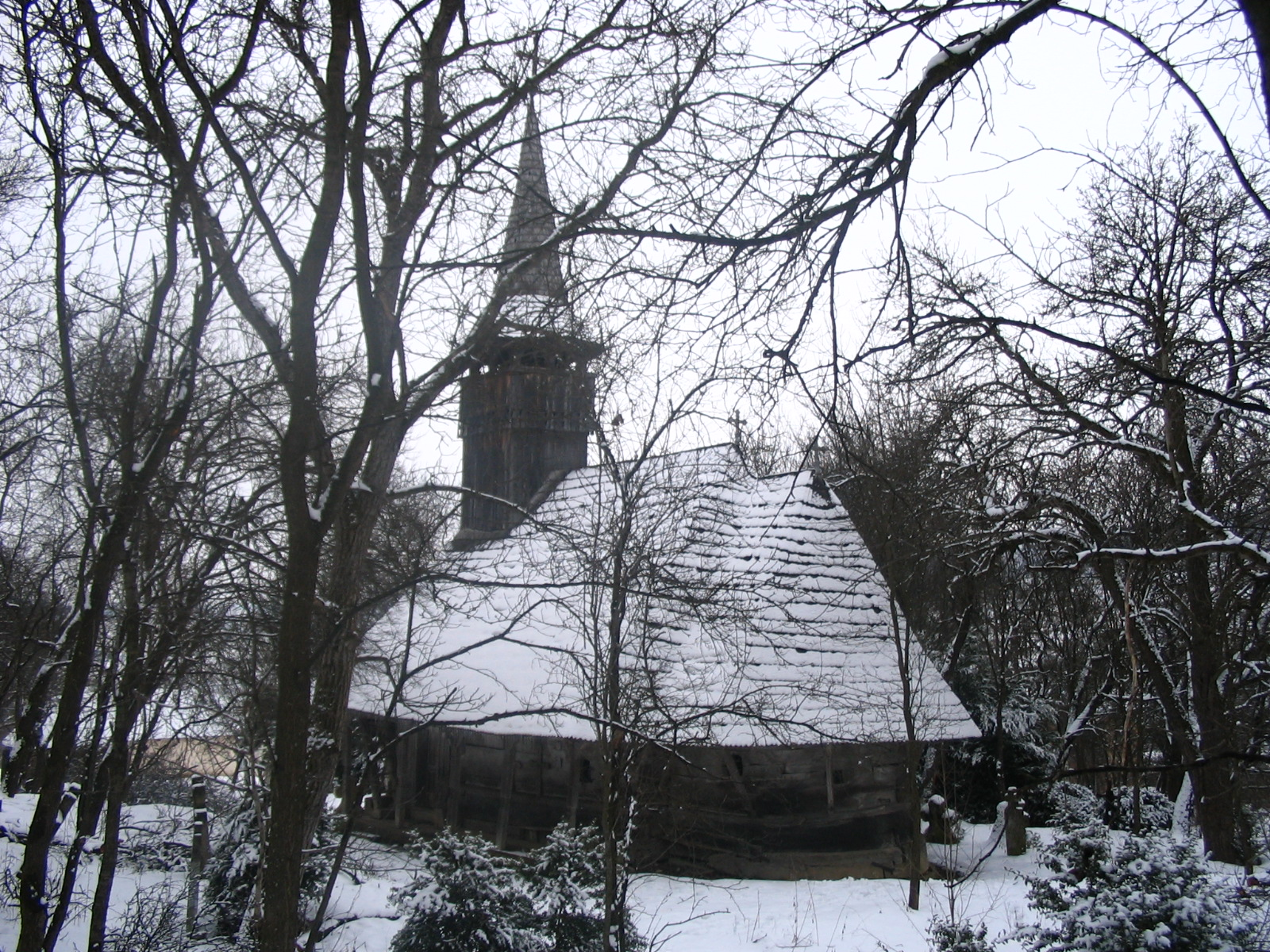
Wooden Church in Bulgari

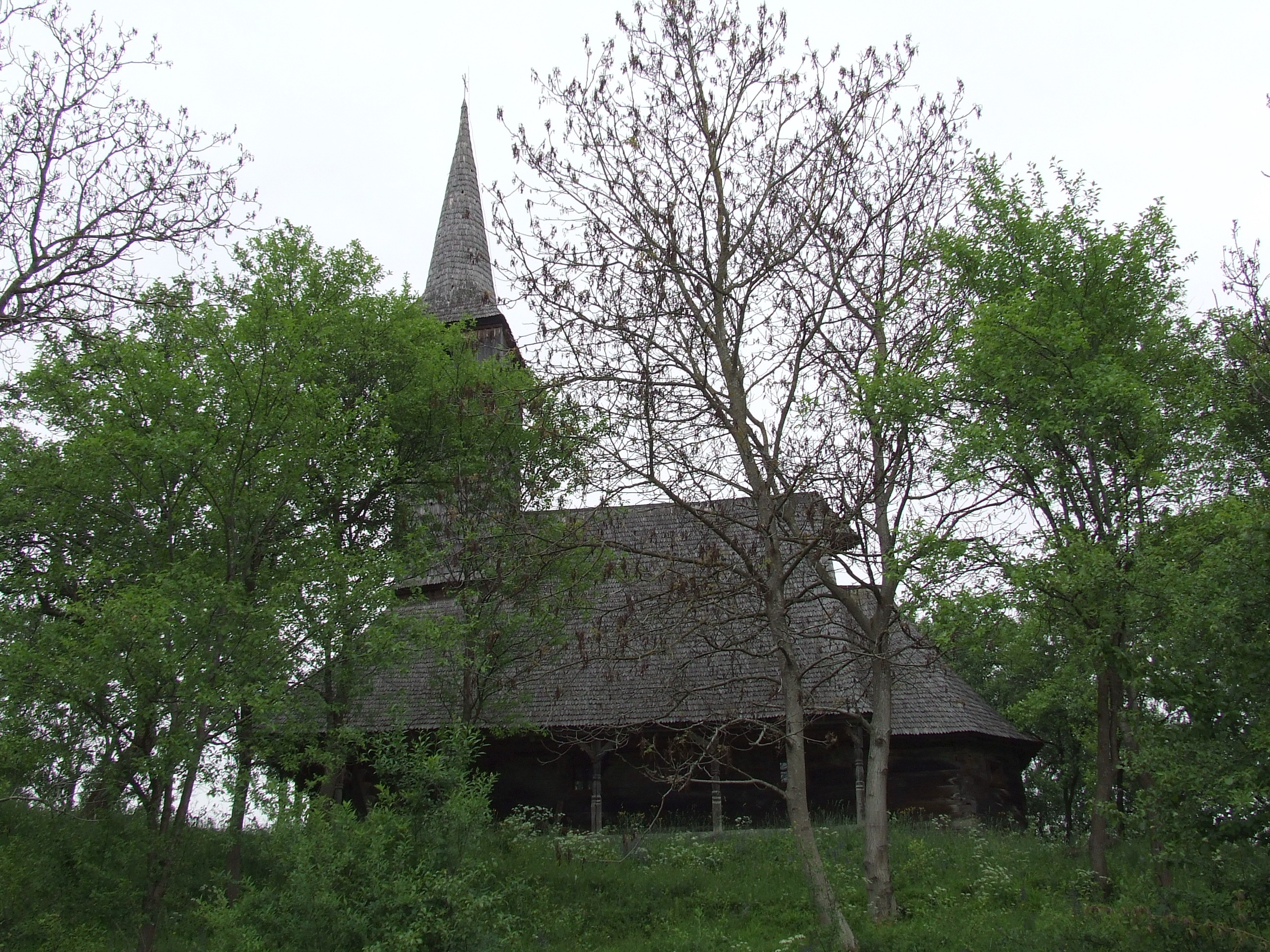
Wooden Church in Noțig
