= Gazeta de Transilvania =

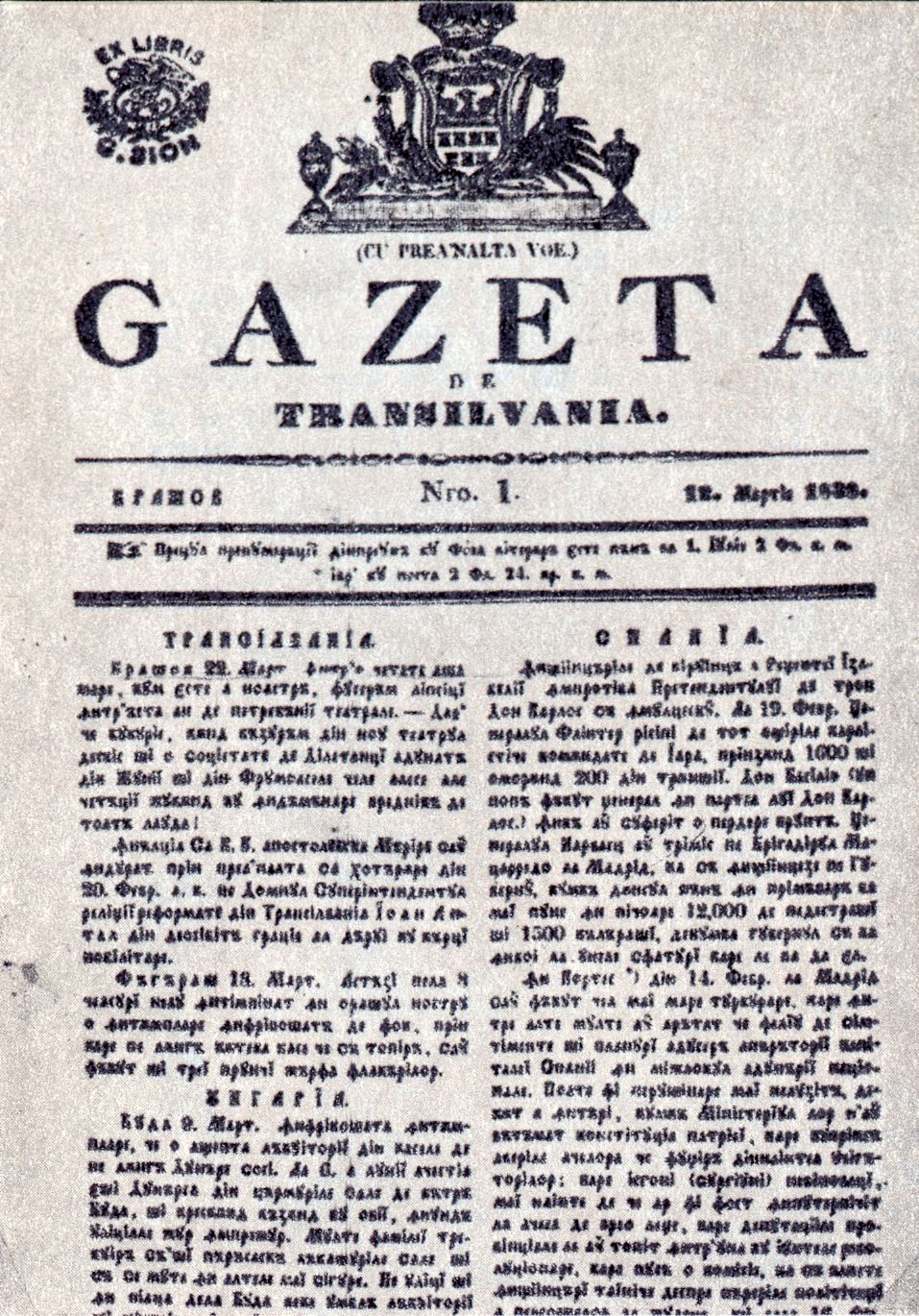
- First edition of Gazeta de Transilvania, March 12, 1838
- Founder: George Bariț
- Founded: 1838
- Language: Romanian

Gazeta de Transilvania was the first Romanian-language newspaper to be published in Transylvania. It was founded by George Bariț in 1838 in Brașov. It played a very important role in the awakening of the Romanian national conscience in Transylvania, and sowed the seeds for the revolution of 1848.

== Bibliography ==
- Academia Republicii Populare Romîne, Dicţionar Enciclopedic Romîn, Editura Politică, București, 1962–1964.
