= Cehu Silvaniei =

Cehu Silvaniei Szilágycseh
- Town
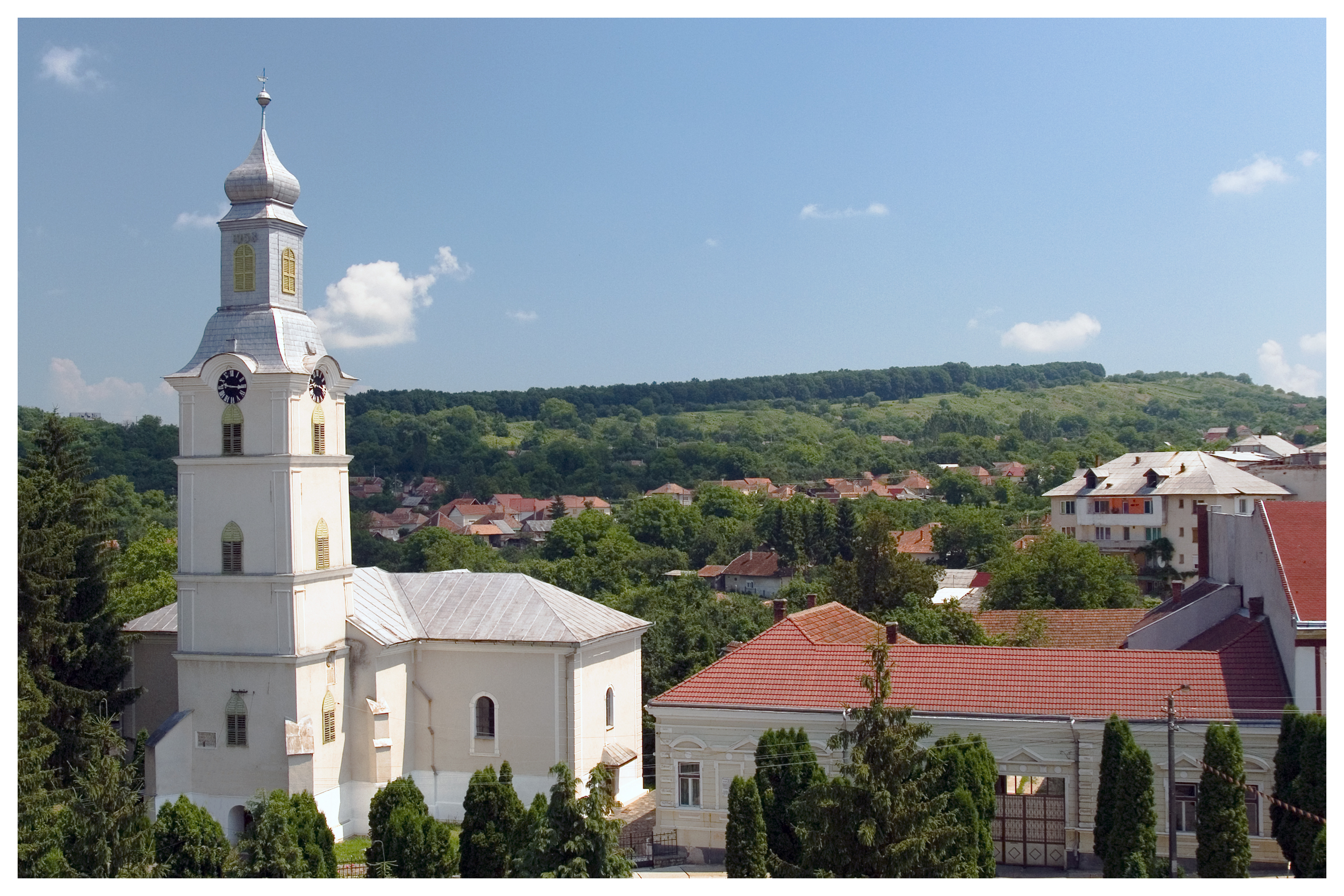
- Reformed Church, Cehu Silvaniei

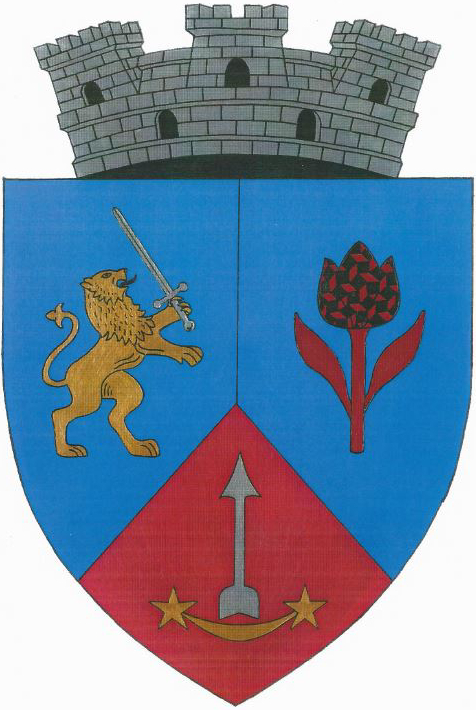
- Coat of arms

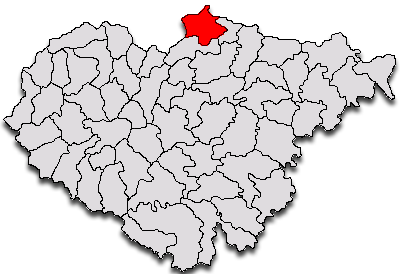
- Location in Sălaj County

- Location in Romania
- Coordinates: 47°25′5″N 23°17′12″E
- Country: Romania
- County: Sălaj

Government
  - Mayor (2024–2028): Ciprian-Aurelian Antișan
- Area: 67.77 km^{2} (26.17 sq mi)
- Elevation: 232 m (761 ft)
- Population (2021-12-01): 6,369
  - Density: 93.98/km^{2} (243.4/sq mi)
- Time zone: UTC+02:00 (EET)
  - Summer (DST): UTC+03:00 (EEST)
- Postal code: 455100
- Area code: (+40) 02 60
- Vehicle reg.: SJ
- Website: primaria-cehusilvaniei.ro

Cehu Silvaniei (Hungarian: Szilágycseh) is a town in Sălaj County, Crișana, Romania. Four villages are administered by the town: Horoatu Cehului (Oláhhorvát), Motiș (Mutos), Nadiș (Szilágynádasd), and Ulciug (Völcsök).

== History of the town ==
The first written mention of the town dates from 1319 under the name Cheevar. In 1405, the city was mentioned under the name Chehy. The Hungarian name of the city referred to a stand of Czech origin.

The town was until 1918 part of the Kingdom of Hungary and specifically of the Principality of Transylvania. In 1529, the voivode István Báthory granted the city the right to govern itself.

After the dissolution of the principality of Transylvania in 1867 and its direct integration into the Austro-Hungarian Empire as part of Hungary (see the Austro-Hungarian Compromise of 1867), the city is attached to Szilágy County in 1876. In 1918, during the disintegration of the empire at the end of World War I, the city became part of the Kingdom of Romania.

From 1940 to 1944 it was annexed by Hungary as a result of the Second Vienna Award. In May 1944, its Jewish community was exterminated by the Nazis during several deportations to Auschwitz.

At the end of World War II, the city was incorporated into Romania again.

The city has long been an agricultural center. In 1968, during the country's administrative reorganization, it acquired city status and then industrialization take place (textiles, furniture).

== Climate ==
Cehu Silvaniei has a humid continental climate (Cfb in the Köppen climate classification).

Climate data for Cehu Silvaniei
Month	Jan	Feb	Mar	Apr	May	Jun	Jul	Aug	Sep	Oct	Nov	Dec	Year
Mean daily maximum °C (°F)	1.7 (35.1)	4.3 (39.7)	9.9 (49.8)	16.3 (61.3)	20.9 (69.6)	24.2 (75.6)	26.2 (79.2)	26.4 (79.5)	21.2 (70.2)	15.2 (59.4)	9.4 (48.9)	3 (37)	14.9 (58.8)
Daily mean °C (°F)	−1.7 (28.9)	0.2 (32.4)	4.9 (40.8)	11 (52)	15.8 (60.4)	19.5 (67.1)	21.3 (70.3)	21.3 (70.3)	16.3 (61.3)	10.5 (50.9)	5.5 (41.9)	0.1 (32.2)	10.4 (50.7)
Mean daily minimum °C (°F)	−5 (23)	−3.7 (25.3)	−0.1 (31.8)	5.1 (41.2)	10 (50)	13.9 (57.0)	15.8 (60.4)	15.8 (60.4)	11.3 (52.3)	6.2 (43.2)	2.1 (35.8)	−2.7 (27.1)	5.7 (42.3)
Average precipitation mm (inches)	58 (2.3)	54 (2.1)	64 (2.5)	67 (2.6)	80 (3.1)	91 (3.6)	87 (3.4)	64 (2.5)	74 (2.9)	68 (2.7)	63 (2.5)	67 (2.6)	837 (32.8)
Source: https://en.climate-data.org/europe/romania/salaj/cehu-silvaniei-15684/

== Demographics ==
Historical population
Year	Pop.	±%
1850	3,482	—
1880	4,298	+23.4%
1900	5,366	+24.8%
1910	5,881	+9.6%
1920	5,843	−0.6%
1930	6,034	+3.3%
1941	6,141	+1.8%
1956	7,147	+16.4%
1966	7,945	+11.2%
1977	8,302	+4.5%
1992	8,954	+7.9%
2002	8,468	−5.4%
2011	7,130	−15.8%
2021	6,369	−10.7%
Source: Census data

At the 2011 census, there were 7,130 inhabitants; of those, 50.4% were Hungarians, 44.5% Romanians, and 4.9% Roma. At the same census, 47% were Romanian Orthodox, 44.4% Reformed, 3.5% Roman Catholic, 2.4% belonged to "another religion", and 1% Baptist. At the 2021 census, Cehu Silvaniei had a population of 6,369, of which 45.85% were Hungarians, 43.07% Romanians, and 4.98% Roma.

== Historic sites and monuments ==
=== Hungarian Reformed Church of Cehu-Silvaniei ===
Probably members of two families, Miklós Drágffy and his wife, and Eufémia Jakcs or their son, Bertalan, later voivod of Transylvania (1493–98) built the church somewhere in the middle of the second half of the 15th century. Governor Drágffy János (1525–26) was an important patron of the church: he made some changes on the church in 1519, and had a lombard-patterned renaissance sedile made for it in 1522.

In 1614, due to the generosity of Prépostváry Zsigmond and his wife Széchy Katalin, the rules of the market-town then, the tower at the western façade is built, as shown by the escutcheoned memorial tablet on its southern wall. The medieval nave is enlarged in 1801, and then 1905, with square side-aisles and the interior gets a classicist proportions. This church is a national monument classified with number SJ-II-m-A-05034.

=== Jewish cemetery ===
The Jewish cemetery is located at Cehu Silvaniei, Cloșca Str. no. 8, Sălaj County, 249.1 miles NNW of Bucharest and 34 km (21 mi) from Zalău.

The 1850 Jewish population by census was 63, in 1857 was 66, in 1880 was 206, in 1900 was 369, in 1910 was 517, and in 1930 was 551. In May 1944, the Jews were transported to the ghetto that the Nazis and their collaborators set up near Cehu Silvaniei (the Cehei ghetto, outside Șimleu Silvaniei), and on May 31 and June 6, 8 they were deported to Auschwitz. The cemetery was established in the 19th century. The last known burial was in the 20th century.

The isolated suburban flat land has no sign or marker. Reached via private road, access is open with permission. A fence with a gate that locks surrounds the site. Approximate 1-20 stones are visible, some not in original location with 25%-50% of the stones being toppled or broken. The location of the stones that have been removed from the cemetery is unknown. Vegetation overgrowth in the cemetery is a seasonal problem preventing access. Water drainage is good all year. There are no special sections.

The oldest known gravestone dates from the 19th century. The 19th and 20th century marble, granite, sandstone, and limestone boulders, flat and shaped, smoothed and inscribed, carved relief decorated gravestones have Hebrew inscriptions. Some have traces of painting on their surfaces. No known mass graves. The national Jewish community owns the property used for Jewish cemetery only. Adjacent properties are residential. The cemetery maintenance worked on the re-erection of stones, patching broken stones, cleaning stones, and clearing vegetation. Current care involves occasional clearing or cleaning of the cemetery by unpaid individuals. There are no structures.

== Natives ==
- Alexandru Koller (born 1953), football player, businessman
- Agi Mishol (born 1947), Israeli poet
- Iosif Șilimon (1918–1981), aircraft designer
