= Băița de sub Codru =

- Commune
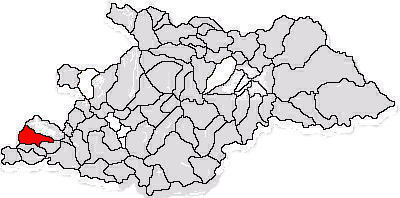
- Location in Maramureș County

- Location in Romania
- Coordinates: 47°31′N 23°08′E
- Country: Romania
- County: Maramureș
- Subdivisions: Băița de sub Codru, Urmeniș

Government
  - Mayor (2024–2028): Bogdan Cătălin Pop (PNL)
- Area: 51.29 km^{2} (19.80 sq mi)
- Elevation: 240 m (790 ft)
- Population (2021-12-01): 1,758
  - Density: 34.28/km^{2} (88.77/sq mi)
- Time zone: UTC+02:00 (EET)
  - Summer (DST): UTC+03:00 (EEST)
- Postal code: 437020
- Area code: +(40) 262
- Vehicle reg.: MM
- Website: baitadesubcodru.ro

Băița de sub Codru (Hungarian: Mosóbánya) is a commune in Maramureș County, Crișana, Romania. It is composed of two villages, Băița de sub Codru and Urmeniș (Bükkörményes).

Historical population
Year	Pop.	±%
1880	1,769	—
1900	2,021	+14.2%
1910	2,056	+1.7%
1930	2,146	+4.4%
1956	2,510	+17.0%
1977	2,348	−6.5%
1992	2,070	−11.8%
2002	1,919	−7.3%
2011	1,871	−2.5%
2021	1,758	−6.0%
Source: Census data
