= Ariniș =

- Commune
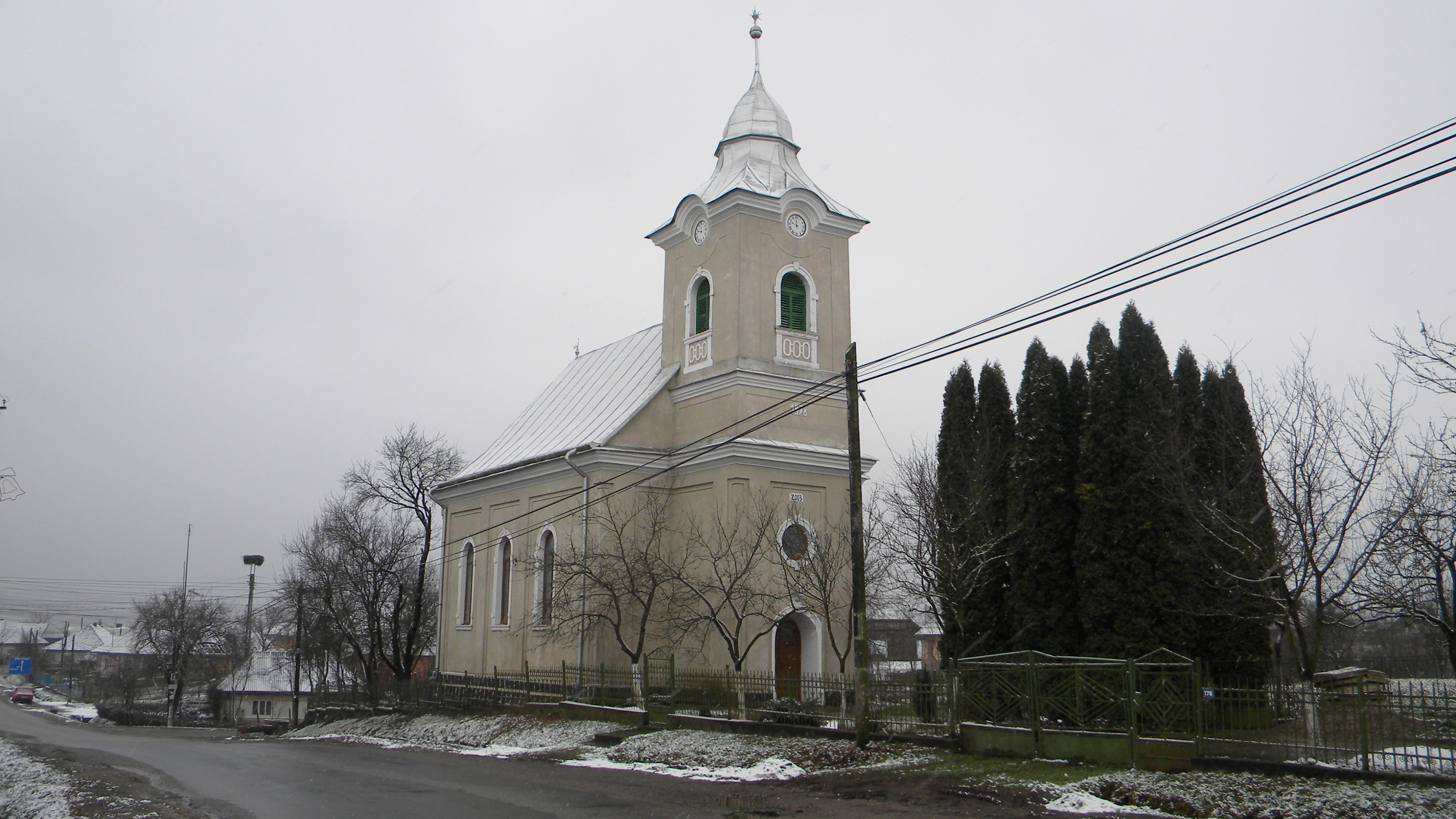
- Reformed Church in Ariniș

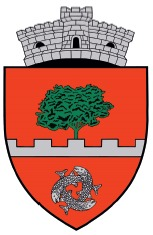
- Coat of arms

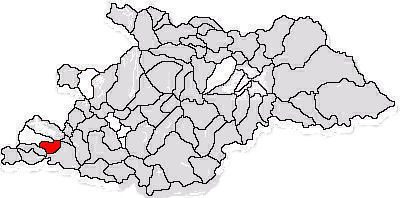
- Location in Maramureș County

- Location in Romania
- Coordinates: 47°30′03″N 23°13′49″E
- Country: Romania
- County: Maramureș

Government
  - Mayor (2020–2024): Gheorghe Mureșan (CMM)
- Area: 27.13 km^{2} (10.47 sq mi)
- Elevation: 166 m (545 ft)
- Population (2021-12-01): 1,081
  - Density: 39.85/km^{2} (103.2/sq mi)
- Time zone: UTC+02:00 (EET)
  - Summer (DST): UTC+03:00 (EEST)
- Postal code: 437010
- Area code: +40 x59
- Vehicle reg.: MM
- Website: comunaarinis.ro

Ariniș (Hungarian: Égerhát) is a commune in Maramureș County, Crișana, Romania. It is composed of three villages: Ariniș, Rodina (Rogyina), and Tămășești (Szilágyegerbegy).

== History ==
The village of Ariniș has been documentary certified since 1543 under the name of "Egherhat". Ariniș was archaeologically documented in the Middle Ages, named "Sub ogrăzi"; Bronze Age, Suciu de Sus culture.

== Economy ==
The main economic activity in the commune is agriculture, which takes place in 582 family farms on an area of 2,246 ha (5,550 acres) of agricultural land. Inside the village there is a fish farm. The industrial part is represented by a manufacturer of rubber products. Residents are working at several stores and warehouses of materials, too.

== Sights ==
- Orthodox Church in Ariniș, built in the 20th century

Historical population
Year	Pop.	±%
1880	1,226	—
1900	1,350	+10.1%
1910	1,562	+15.7%
1930	1,795	+14.9%
1956	2,170	+20.9%
1977	1,639	−24.5%
1992	1,272	−22.4%
2002	1,208	−5.0%
2011	1,084	−10.3%
2021	1,081	−0.3%
Source: Census data

== Natives ==
- Ioan Dragomir (1905–1985), Romanian bishop of the Greek-Catholic Church
- Mihai Olos (1940–2015), conceptual artist, poet, and essayist
