= Breban =

Breban may refer to:

- Bréban, a commune in the Marne department in north-eastern France

== Family name ==
- Nicolae Breban (born 1934, Baia Mare, Romania), a Romanian novelist and essayist

== See also ==
- Breb (disambiguation)
- Brebi
- Brebu (disambiguation)
- Brebina (disambiguation)
- Brebeni
- Brebenei
- Breboaia
