= Breb =

Breb or BREB may refer to:

- Breb, a village in the Ocna Șugatag commune in Maramureș County, Romania
- Breb River, another name for the Breboaia River in Maramureș County, Romania
- Louis Alphonse de Brébisson (1798–1888), a French botanist and photographer referenced in scientific literature as Bréb.
- Bangladesh Rural Electrification Board

== See also ==
- Brebu (disambiguation)
- Brebina (disambiguation)
- Brebeni, the name of three villages in Romania
