= Râușor (Mara) =

- Location within Romania

Location
- Country: Romania
- Counties: Maramureș County

Physical characteristics
- Mouth: Mara
  - location: Mara
  - coordinates: 47.7566°N 23.8304°E
- Length: 10 km (6.2 mi)
- Basin size: 37 km^{2} (14 sq mi)

Basin features
- Progression: Mara→ Iza→ Tisza→ Danube→ Black Sea
- Tributaries
  - left: Izvorul Negru
  - right: Hopșia

The Râușor is a right tributary of the Mara in Maramureș County, Romania. It discharges into the Mara in the village Mara. Its main tributaries are the Izvorul Negru and the Hopșia. Its length is 10 km (6.2 mi) and its basin size is 37 km^{2} (14 sq mi).
