= Valea Podului River =

Valea Podului River may refer to:

- Valea Podului, a tributary of the Mara in Romania
- Valea Podului, a tributary of the Someșul Mare in Romania
