= Cosău =

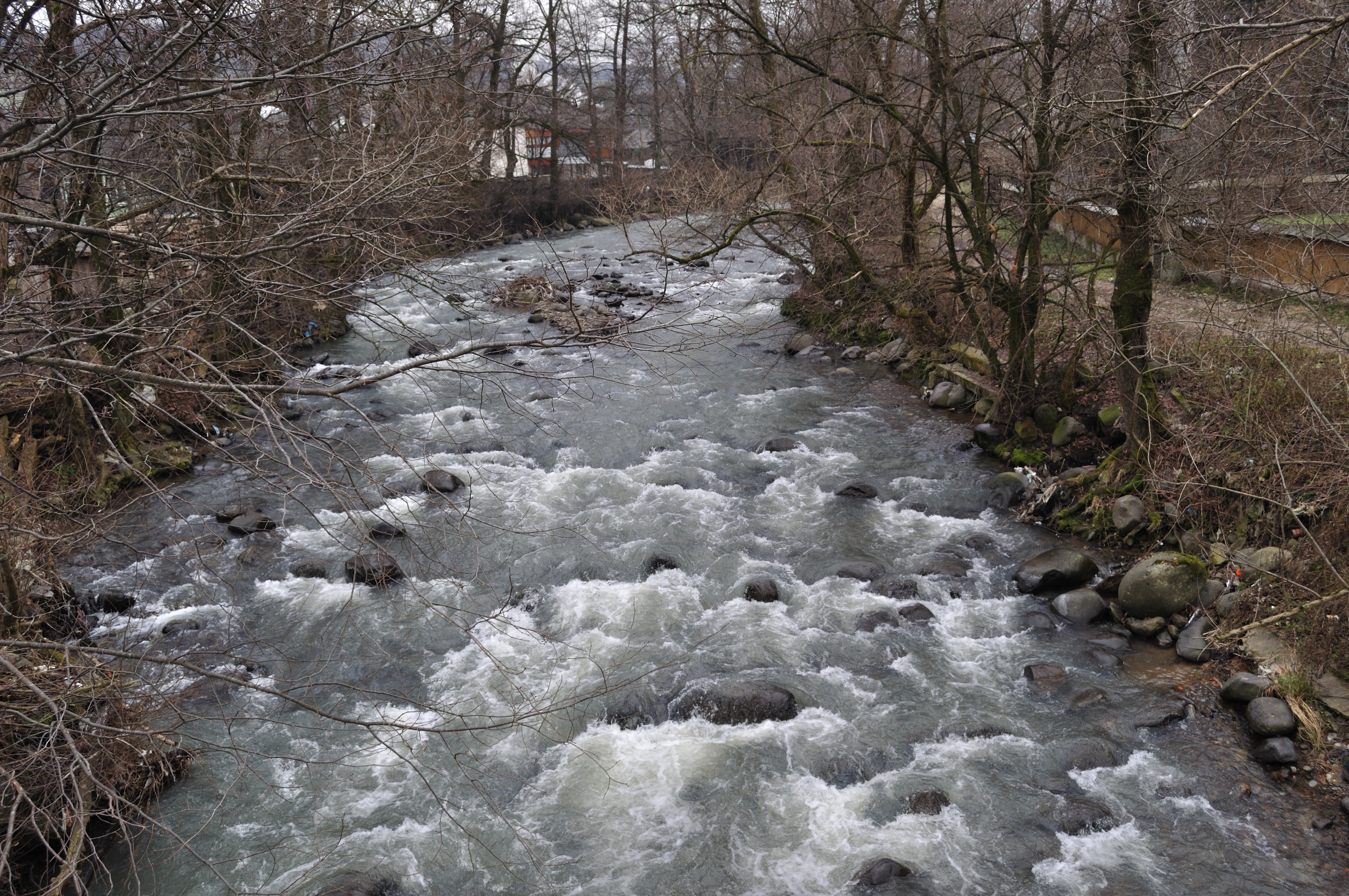

- Location within Romania

Location
- Country: Romania
- Counties: Maramureș County
- Villages: Budești, Călinești, Cornești, Ferești

Physical characteristics
- Mouth: Mara
  - location: Ferești
  - coordinates: 47.8434°N 23.9367°E
- Length: 25 km (16 mi)
- Basin size: 116 km^{2} (45 sq mi)

Basin features
- Progression: Mara→ Iza→ Tisza→ Danube→ Black Sea
- Tributaries
  - left: Sâva, Oanța, Râușor
  - right: Valea Popii

The Cosău (Hungarian: Kaszó) is a right tributary of the river Mara in Romania. It discharges into the Mara near Ferești. Its length is 25 km (16 mi) and its basin size is 116 km^{2} (45 sq mi).
