= Ilie Lazăr =

Romanian jurist and politician

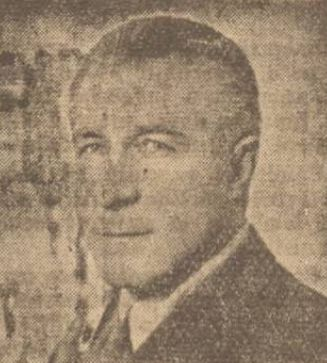
- Born: Ilie Lazăr; December 12, 1895; Giulești, Maramureș
- Died: November 6, 1976 (aged 80); Cluj-Napoca
- Occupation: Lawyer
- Known for: Leading member of National Peasants' Party, Youngest delegate to Great National Assembly of Alba Iulia

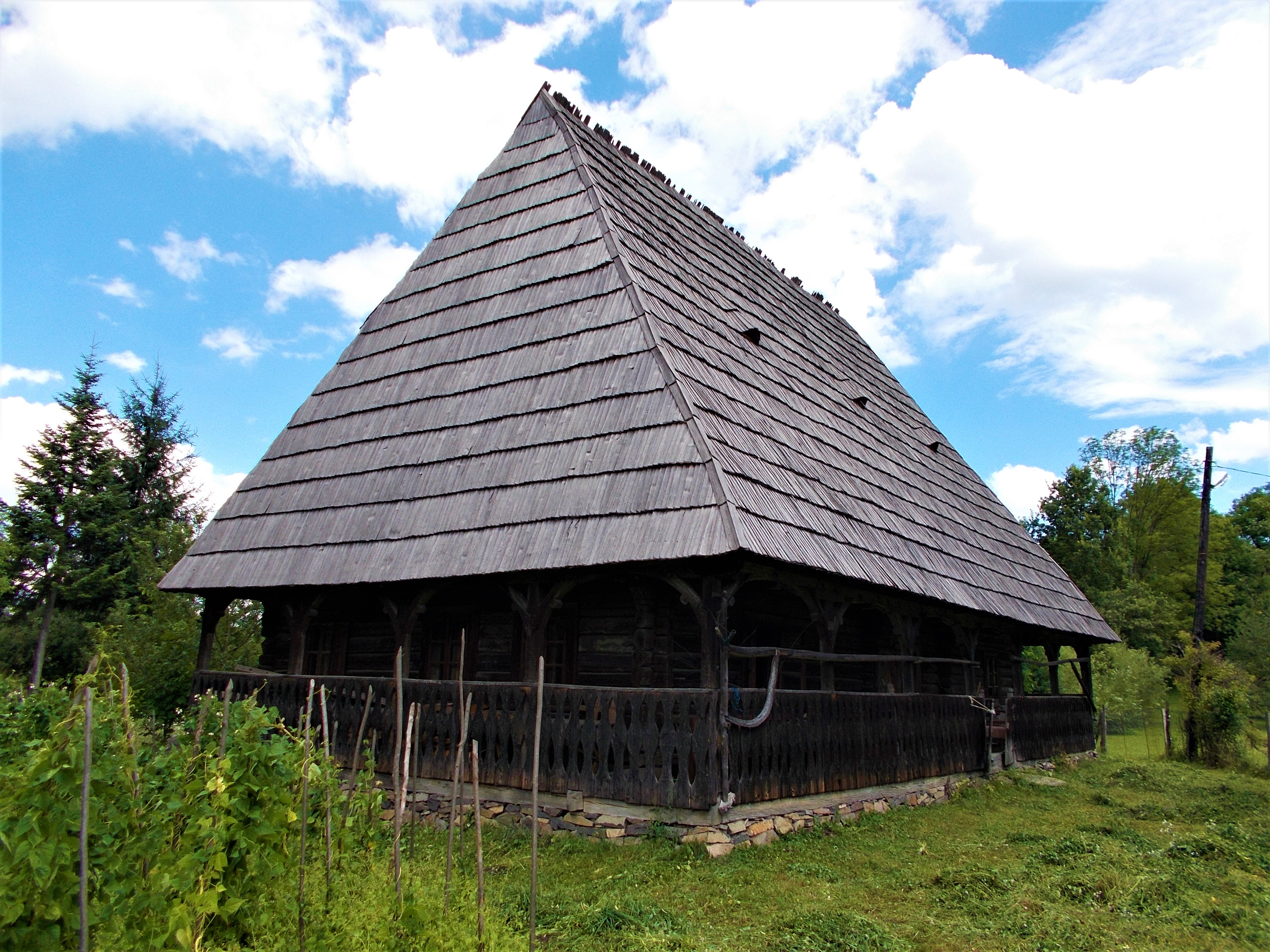
The house inhabited by Ilie Lazăr in Giulești

Ilie Lazăr (born December 12, 1895, Giulești, Maramureș County - d. November 6, 1976 Cluj-Napoca) was a Romanian jurist and politician, a leading member of the National Peasants' Party in the interwar period and the right-hand man of Iuliu Maniu.

Lazăr fought in World War I to release Cernăuți, then he and Moldavian troops participated in the liberation of Sighet, where he would be imprisoned 34 years later. He was firstly a member of the Romanian National Party and in 1928 he won the seat of deputy for the National Peasants' Party.

In 1946, before the parliamentary elections, he was arrested by the communist authorities on charges of treason, was imprisoned for seven months. His wife, Maria Lazăr, won the seat of deputy in his place, proving his popularity.

In 1947 is involved in Tămădău Affair, the starting point of a lawsuit filed against personalities of National Peasants' Party (PNȚ). On November 12, 1947, after the trial, he was sentenced to 12 years hard imprisonment, 5 years loss of citizenship, confiscation of property, and 50,000 lei costs of the proceedings. Lazăr was first sent to a prison in Galați; in 1951 he was transferred to the notorious Sighet Prison, and in 1956 he was sent to a prison in Râmnicu Sărat.

== Family ==
His parents were descendants of old Romanian families of gentry, his father was a descendant of the family Lazăr of Purcăreț, and his mother was descended from the family Ivașcu from Apșa de Jos. His grandfather, Vasile Lazăr, was priest and law degree, was archpriest of Sighet, and he descended from seven generations of priests.
