= Memorial of the Victims of Communism and of the Resistance =

Museum in Sighetu Marmației, Romania

Coordinates: 47°55′36″N 23°53′28″E

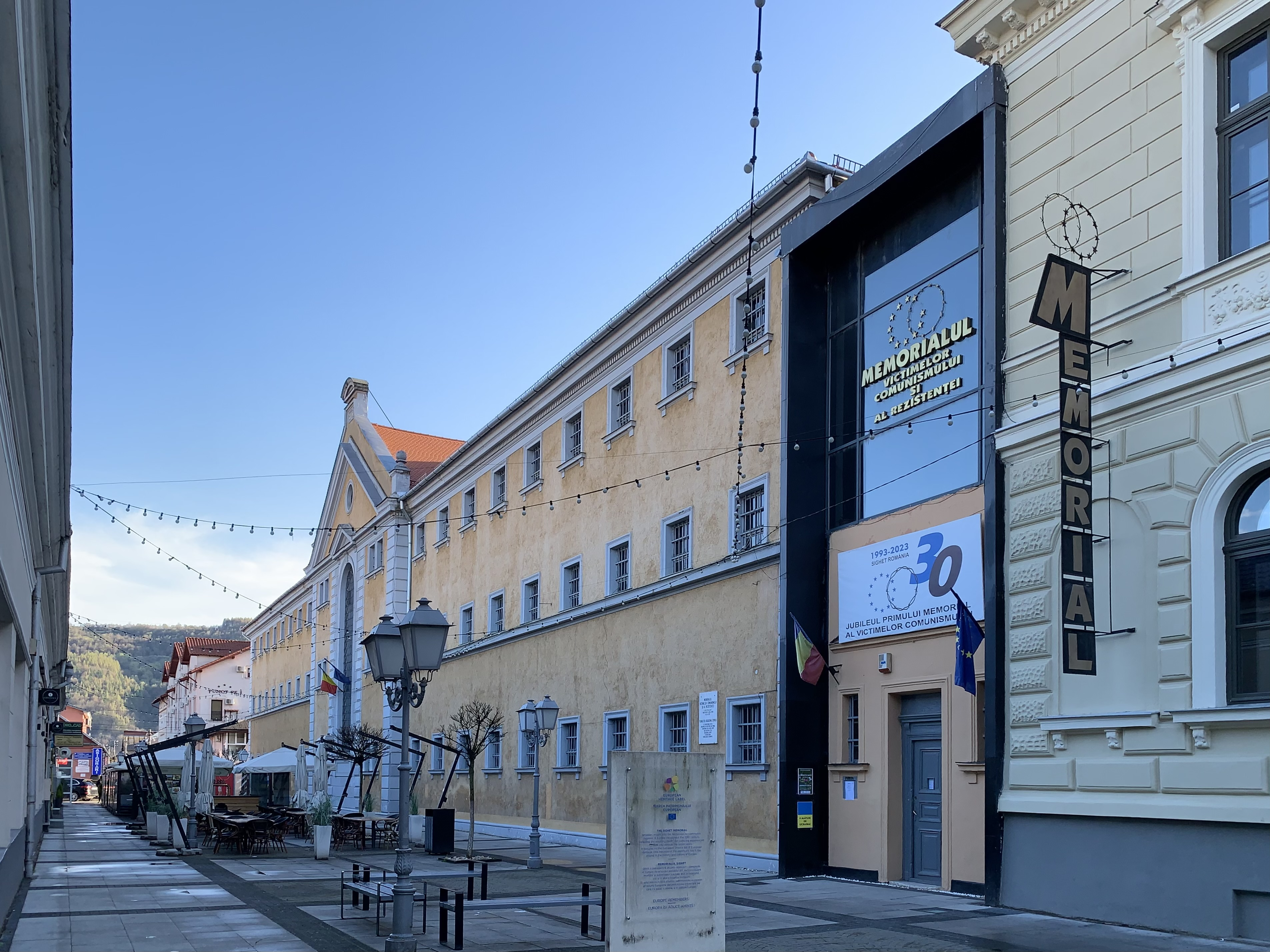
The exterior of the Sighet Memorial Museum in Sighetu Marmației

The Memorial of the Victims of Communism and of the Resistance (Romanian: Memorialul Victimelor Comunismului și al Rezistenței) in Romania consists of the Sighet Museum (often confused with the Memorial), located in the city of Sighetu Marmației, Maramureș County, and the International Centre for Studies into Communism, located in Bucharest.

== International Centre for Studies into Communism ==
The Centre was founded in 1993 by Ana Blandiana and Romulus Rusan. Created and administered by the Civic Academy Foundation, it is an institute of research, museography and education.

== Sighet Memorial Museum ==
The museum was created by the Centre for Studies into Communism out of the remnants of the former Sighet Prison in 1993.

The restoration of the prison building was completed in 2000. Each prison cell became a museum room, which together presented the chronology of the totalitarian system in Communist Romania.

In 1998, the Council of Europe identified the Sighet Memorial as one of the main sites that preserve the continent's memory, alongside the Auschwitz-Birkenau State Museum and the Mémorial de Caen.
