= Michel Klein (veterinarian) =

French television presenter (1921–2024)

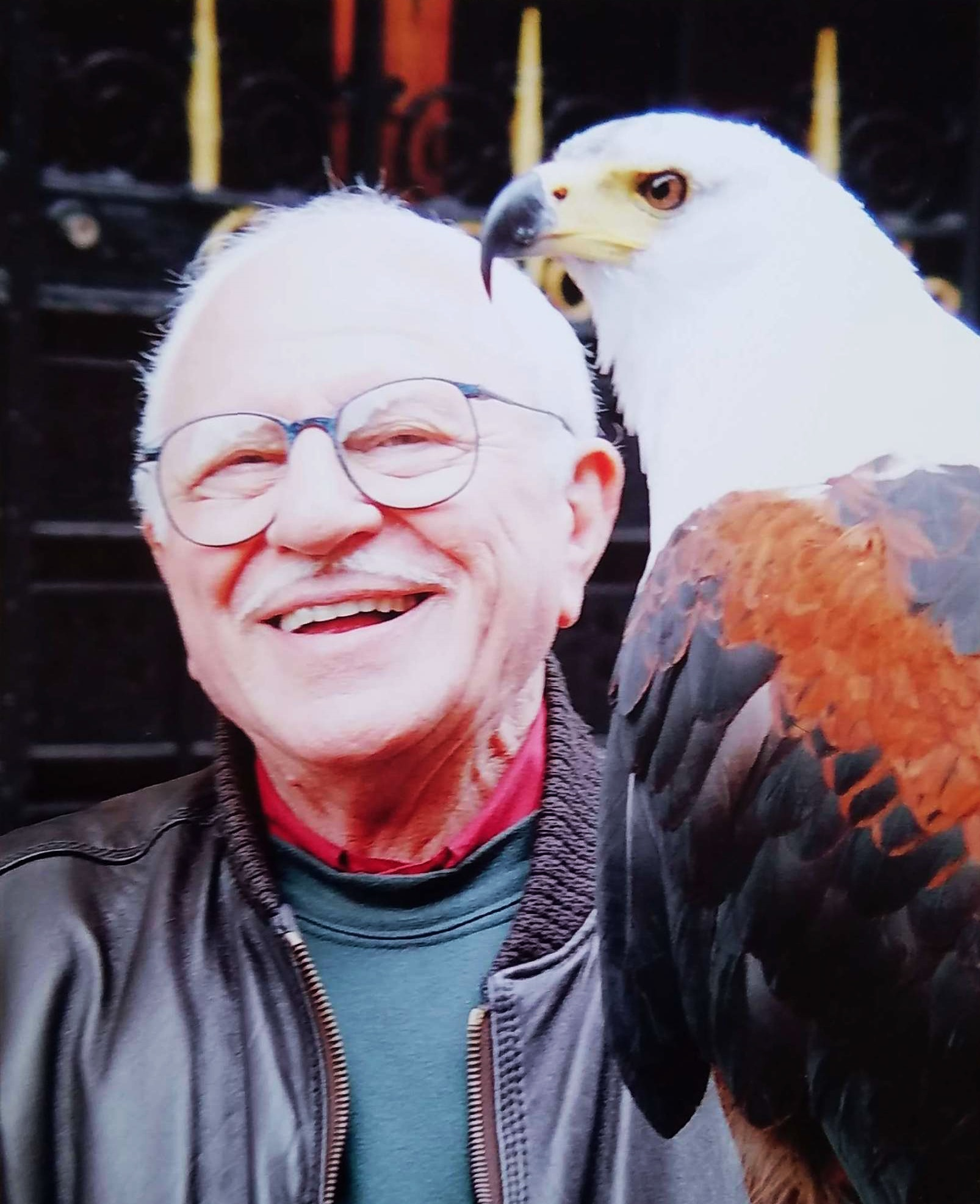
- Michel Klein in 1996
- Born: 19 April 1921; Sighet, Romania
- Died: 19 October 2024 (aged 103); Rueil-Malmaison, France
- Honours: Knight of the Legion of Honour

Michel Klein (19 April 1921 – 19 October 2024) was a Romanian-born French veterinarian. He was known for his veterinary work on zoo animals, as well as for his television awareness programs in favor of animal rights around the world. He appeared on programs such as Club Dorothée, 30 millions d'amis, Télématin, and Terre attention danger.

== Biography ==
Klein was born on 19 April 1921 in Sighet in northwestern Romania. His family was Jewish. In the 1930s, his parents sent him to France for his schooling. He attended veterinary school at the École nationale vétérinaire de Toulouse. During World War II, he joined the Prunus network, an agency of the Special Operations Executive before fleeing to Spain when his resistance network was dismantled by the Germans. His parents and sister were deported from Romania to Auschwitz, from where only his sister came back.

Klein returned to France after the war, and in the 1950s opened one of the first veterinary practices in Paris. Starting in the 1960s, he made regular television appearances on programs which promoted animal welfare including Je cherche un maître, Les Animaux du monde, 30 millions d'amis and Terre, attention danger on TF1, which he presented for more than ten years with Dorothée. He proposed the project which led to chapter II of the Law of 10 July 1976, which created protections for animals. He also made the initial proposal to identify dogs by tattooing.

Klein served as vice president of the Société Protectrice des Animaux from 1960 to 1978. He co-founded the National Council for Animal Protection, and worked with Jacques Chirac to establish the Paris Guide Dog School for the Blind and Visually Impaired (French: l'Ecole des chiens guides pour aveugles et malvoyants de Paris). In 1994, he was made a Knight of the Legion of Honour by then-Prime Minister Edouard Balladur. In 2021, he received the silver medal of the Order of Veterinarians.

Klein published a book on his young adult life, titled Ces Bêtes qui m'ont fait Homme. He was married to Marie-Christine Klein.

Klein died on 19 October 2024, at the age of 103, in Rueil-Malmaison, Hauts-de-Seine.

== Publications ==
- Klein, Michel (1976). Ces bêtes qui m'ont fait homme [These beasts that made me a man] (in French). R. Laffont. ISBN 978-2-245-00538-5.
- Klein, Michel (1979). Ce qu'ils nous apprennent [What they teach us] (in French). Robert Laffont. ISBN 2-221-00330-6.
- Klein, Michel (2006). L'avocat des bêtes [The Animal Advocate] (in French). Éditions Anne Carrière. ISBN 2843373743.
- Klein, Michel; Hasbrouck, Michel (2010). Réussir son chien [Succeeding with your dog] (in French). Éditions Helvedog. ISBN 978-2-8399-0647-0.
