= Brebu =

Brebu may refer to several places in Romania:

- Brebu, Caraș-Severin, a commune in Caraș-Severin County
- Brebu, Prahova, a commune in Prahova County
  - Brebu Monastery, constructed in 1640
- Brebu Nou, a commune in Caraș-Severin County
- Brebu, a village in Lopătari Commune, Buzău County
- Brebu, a village in Runcu Commune, Dâmbovița County
- Brebu (Bâsca), a tributary of the Bâsca Mică in Buzău County
- Brebu, a tributary of the Slănic in Buzău County
- Brebu, a tributary of the Timiș in Caraș-Severin County

== See also ==
- Breb (disambiguation)
- Brebina (disambiguation)
