= Desești =

- Commune
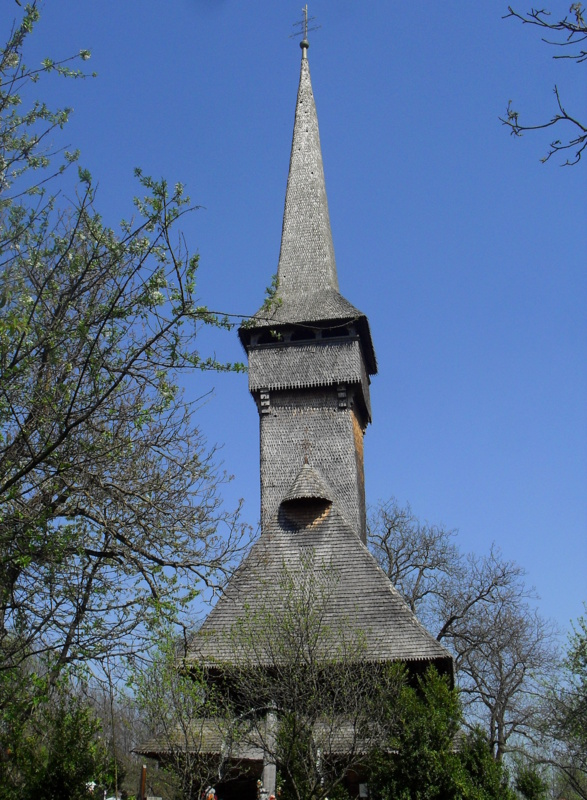
- Desești wooden church

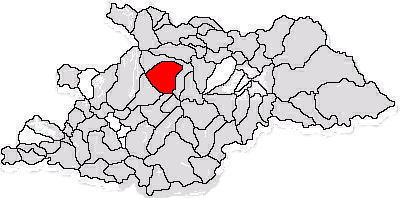
- Location in Maramureș County

- Location in Romania
- Coordinates: 47°46′N 23°51′E
- Country: Romania
- County: Maramureș

Government
  - Mayor (2020–2024): Gheorghe Bohotici (PNL)
- Area: 144.04 km^{2} (55.61 sq mi)
- Elevation: 430 m (1,410 ft)
- Population (2021-12-01): 2,179
  - Density: 15.13/km^{2} (39.18/sq mi)
- Time zone: UTC+02:00 (EET)
  - Summer (DST): UTC+03:00 (EEST)
- Postal code: 437135
- Area code: (+40) 02 62
- Vehicle reg.: MM
- Website: primariadesestimm.ro

Desești (Hungarian: Desze, Yiddish: דעסעשט, romanized: Desht or Desest) is a commune in Maramureș County, Maramureș, Romania. It is composed of three villages: Desești, Hărnicești (Hernécs), and Mara (Crăcești until 1956; Krácsfalva).

The commune belongs to the Baia Mare metropolitan area. It is located in the central part of Maramureș County, about 28 km (17 mi) km south of Sighetu Marmației and 40 km (25 mi) northeast of the county seat, Baia Mare. It is situated at an altitude of 430 m (1,410 ft), in a hilly region on the southeastern slopes of the Gutin Mountains. Desești lies on the banks of the river Mara and its right tributary, the river Breboaia.

Historical population
Year	Pop.	±%
1880	2,467	—
1900	2,904	+17.7%
1910	3,372	+16.1%
1930	3,164	−6.2%
1956	3,217	+1.7%
1977	3,117	−3.1%
1992	2,883	−7.5%
2002	2,633	−8.7%
2011	2,341	−11.1%
2021	2,179	−6.9%
Source: Census data

At the 2021 census, Desești had a population of 2,179, with an absolute majority (95%) of ethnic Romanians.

The commune's Saint Parascheva Church was built in 1770 and is one of eight Wooden Churches of Maramureș that are listed by UNESCO as a World Heritage Site.
