= Simon Ungar =

Doctor of oriental medicine and rabbi (1864–1942)

Rabbi Simon Ungar Dr.

Personal life
- Born: 1864 Máramarossziget, Kingdom of Hungary, (now Sighetu Marmației, Romania)
- Died: 29 July 1942 (aged 78) died in the cattle wagon routed to Jasenovac concentration camp

Religious life
- Religion: Judaism
- Denomination: Orthodox Judaism
- Synagogue: Osijek Synagogue
- Position: Rabbi
- Residence: Osijek

Dr. Simon Ungar (1864–1942) was a doctor of oriental medicine and rabbi of the Osijek Jewish Community who was killed during the Holocaust.

Ungar was born in Máramarossziget, Kingdom of Hungary (now Sighetu Marmației, Romania) to an Orthodox Jewish family. His family spoke Yiddish. After he was educated by his father, a teacher, Ungar continued studying Talmud. At the same time he also learned Hungarian language. Ungar continued his high school education in Budapest, Hungary. He also attended rabbinical seminar and studied at the Budapest Faculty of Philosophy. Ungar was fluent in Yiddish, Hebrew, Croatian, Hungarian, Serbian, German and Latin. Upon completing his education Ungar was rabbi in Szekszárd, Hungary. In 1901 he was appointed as the chief rabbi of the Osijek Jewish Community. He was very active in the Osijek Jewish community and actively participated in the Osijek's cultural and social life. In 1942 Ungar was arrested, he died during deportation in the cattle wagon routed to Jasenovac concentration camp.

== Bibliography ==
- Živaković-Kerže, Zlata (2005). Židovi u Osijeku (1918.-1941.). Osijek: Židovska općina Osijek – Tiskara Pauk d.o.o., Cerna. ISBN 953-6659-22-0.
