= Giulești, Maramureș =

Giulești
- Commune
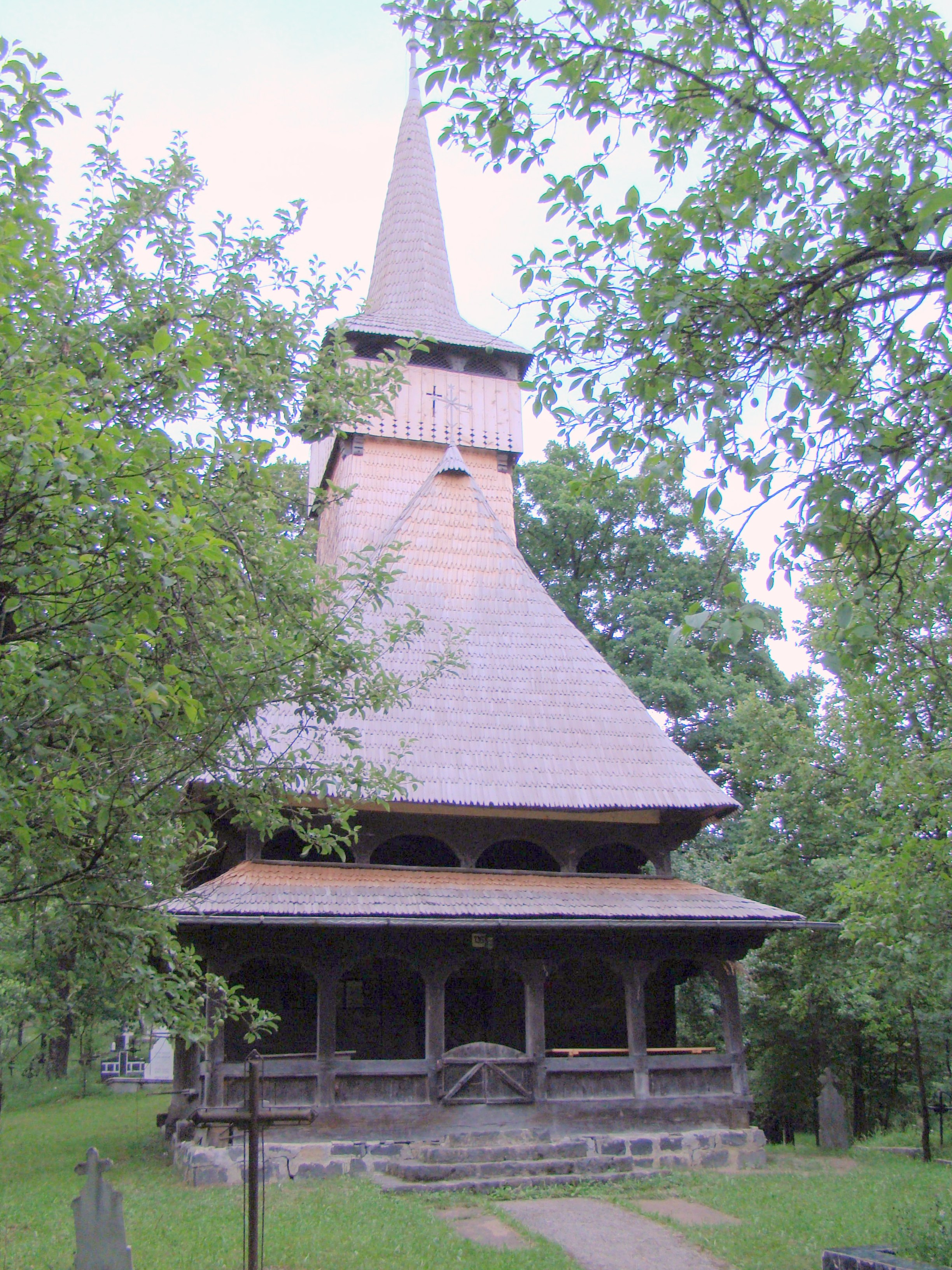
- Wooden church in Ferești

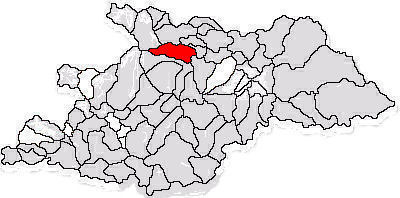
- Location in Maramureș County

- Location in Romania
- Coordinates: 47.8222°N 23.9308°E
- Country: Romania
- County: Maramureș

Government
  - Mayor (2020–2024): Laurențiu Batin (PNL)
- Area: 82.80 km^{2} (31.97 sq mi)
- Elevation: 300 m (980 ft)
- Population (2021-12-01): 2,841
  - Density: 34.31/km^{2} (88.87/sq mi)
- Time zone: UTC+02:00 (EET)
  - Summer (DST): UTC+03:00 (EEST)
- Postal code: 437160
- Area code: (+40) 02 62
- Vehicle reg.: MM
- Website: primariagiulesti.ro

Giulești (Hungarian: Máragyulafalva; Yiddish: ז'יולשט, romanized: Julest, German: Ludwigsdorf) is a commune in Maramureș County, Maramureș, Romania. It is composed of four villages: Berbești (Bárdfalva or Bartfalva), Ferești (Fejérfalva), Giulești, and Mănăstirea (Gyulamonostor).

The commune is located in the northern part of Maramureș County, on national road DN18, 48 km (30 mi) northeast of the county seat, Baia Mare, and 18 km (11 mi) south of Sighetu Marmației. It lies on the banks of the river Mara and its tributary, the river Cosău.

Historical population
Year	Pop.	±%
1880	3,146	—
1900	4,206	+33.7%
1910	4,526	+7.6%
1930	4,679	+3.4%
1956	4,265	−8.8%
1977	4,016	−5.8%
1992	3,777	−6.0%
2002	3,366	−10.9%
2011	3,113	−7.5%
2021	2,841	−8.7%
Source: Census data

== Natives ==
- Ilie Lazăr (1895–1976), jurist and politician
- Atanasie Rednic (1722–1772), Bishop of Făgăraș and Primate of the Romanian Greek Catholic Church
