= Kornélia Prielle =

Hungarian actress (1826–1906)

- Antónia Prielle
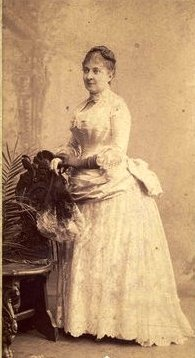
- Born: Antónia Prielle; June 1, 1826; Máramarossziget, Hungary (today Sighetu Marmației, Romania)
- Died: February 25, 1906 (aged 79); Budapest, Hungary
- Resting place: Szabadszállás, Hungary
- Citizenship: Hungarian
- Title: Perpetual Member of the National Theatre, Budapest
- Spouse(s): Kálmán Szerdahelyi (m.1847, d.1848); Elek Hidassy (m.1849, d.1853) Kálmán Rozsnyay (m. 1905)
- Parents: Joseph Prielle (father); Eleonóra Székely (mother)

Kornélia Prielle (June 1, 1826 – February 25, 1906), was a Hungarian stage actress. She was the first actor to be honored by being a Perpetual Member of the National Theatre in Budapest, and is counted as a member of the pioneer generation there.

== Life ==
Kornélia Prielle was the daughter of a French immigrant and stable worker, Joseph Prielle. She and her siblings were active in travelling theater companies as children. In 1841, she debuted officially at the stage in Szatmárnémeti (now Satu Mare, Romania). She made her first performance at the National Theatre in Budapest in 1844. She was engaged at the National Theatre from 1861 until her death, and was made actor for life at the theatre in 1881.

== Personal life ==
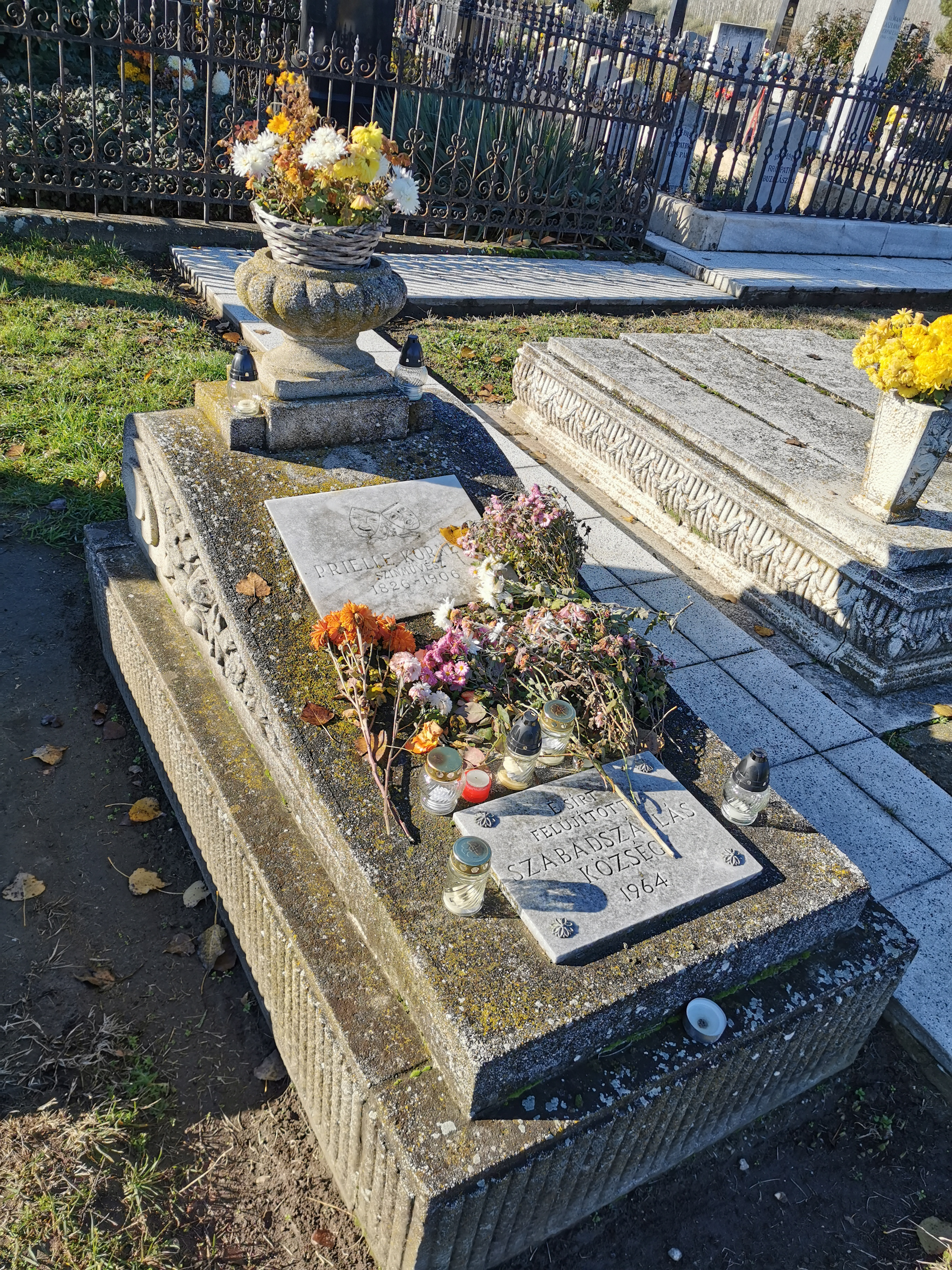
Prielle's grave in Szabadszállás

She married four times. Her first marriage with Kálmán Szerdahelyi lasted from 1847 until 1848. Between 1849 and 1853 she was married to Elek Hidassy. Then she married Szerdahelyi again. Two months before her death she married Kálmán Rozsnyay in 1905.

She was a Reformed Christian and of her father's side of French descent.
