= Ludovic Bruckstein =

Ludovic Bruckstein (27 July 1920 – 4 August 1988) was a Romanian writer.

== Biography ==
He was born in Mukachevo, Czechoslovakia (now Ukraine), and grew up in Sighet, Maramureș, in the northern region of Transylvania.

He was the son of Mordechai Bruckstein, the owner of a small factory making walking canes, and exporting medicinal plants. His great-grandfather, Chaim-Josef Bruckstein, a Hassidic rabbi was among the first chassidim.

In Spring 1944, after a few months in the Sighet ghetto, the Bruckstein family, father, mother and four children, were deported to Auschwitz, as were all of the town's Jews. Only Bruckstein and his younger brother, Israel, survived.

== Works ==
- Maybe even happiness (Poate chiar fericire), translated from the Romanian by Alistair Ian Blyth, London : Istros Books, 2026, ISBN 978-1-912545-55-1
- The fate of Yaakov Maggid, translated from the Romanian by Alistair Ian Blyth, London : Istros Books, 2023, ISBN 978-1-912545-36-0
- With an unopened umbrella in the pouring rain, short stories, translated from the Romanian by Alistair Ian Blyth, London : Istros Books, 2020, ISBN 978-1-912545-22-3
- The trap : two novellas (Scorbura), translated from the Romanian by Alistair Ian Blyth, London : Istros Books, 2019, ISBN 978-1-912545-31-5
