= Brebina =

Brebina may refer to the following places in Romania:

- Brebina, a village in the town of Baia de Aramă, Mehedinți County,
- Brebina, a village in Scrioaștea Commune, Teleorman County, Romania
- Brebina Mare, a tributary of the river Bârsa in Brașov County
- Brebina (Motru), a tributary of the river Motru in Mehedinți County

== See also ==
- Breb (disambiguation)
- Brebu (disambiguation)
