= Călinești, Maramureș =

Călinești
- Commune
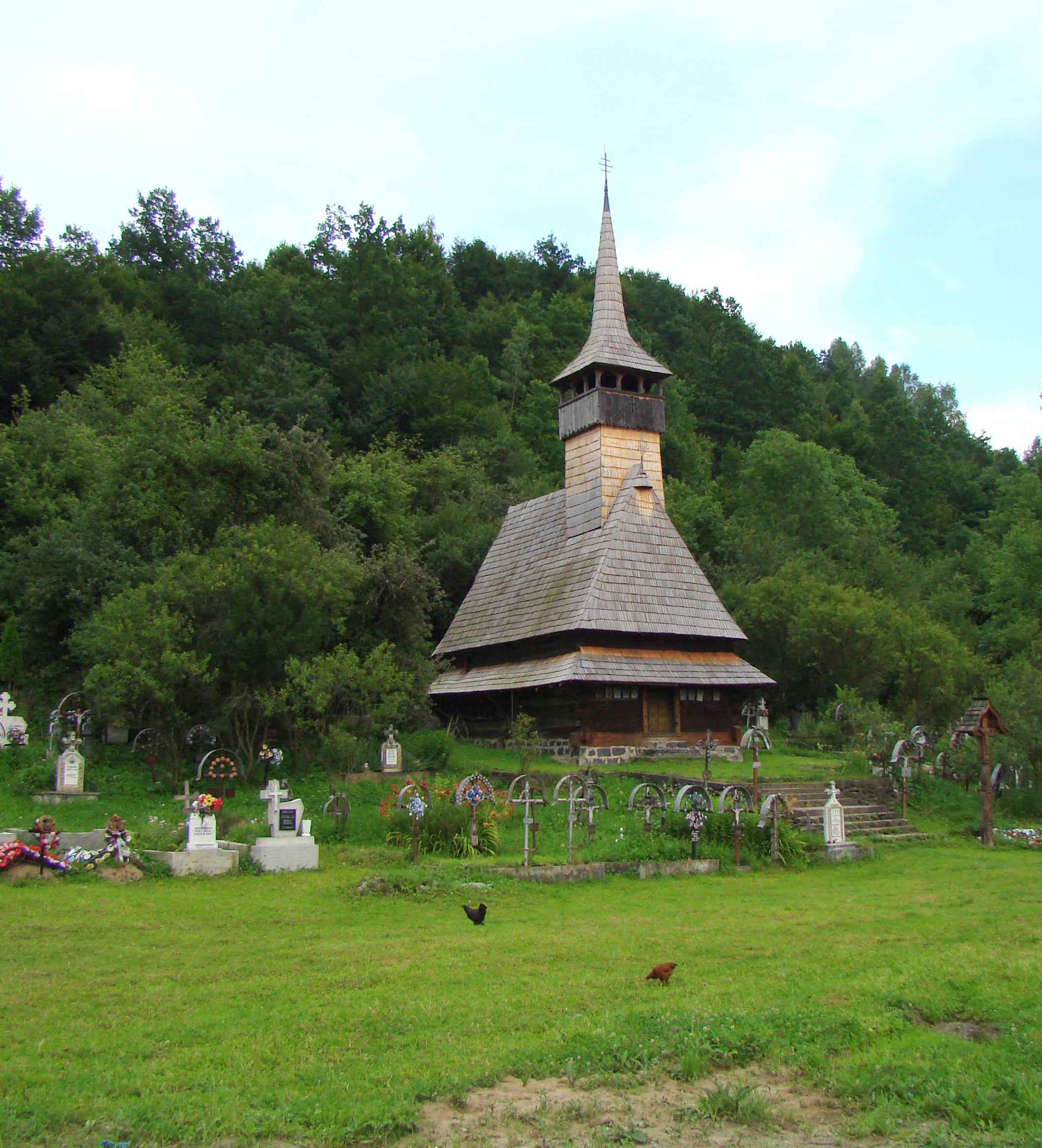
- Wooden church in Cornești

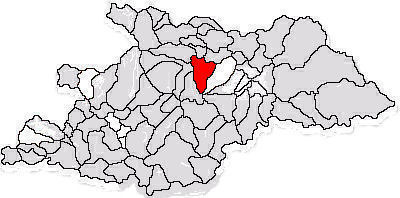
- Location in Maramureș County

- Location in Romania
- Coordinates: 47°47′N 23°58′E
- Country: Romania
- County: Maramureș

Government
  - Mayor (2020–2024): Petru Nemeș (PMP)
- Area: 66.12 km^{2} (25.53 sq mi)
- Elevation: 390 m (1,280 ft)
- Population (2021-12-01): 3,049
  - Density: 46.11/km^{2} (119.4/sq mi)
- Time zone: UTC+02:00 (EET)
  - Summer (DST): UTC+03:00 (EEST)
- Postal code: 437075
- Area code: +(40) 262
- Vehicle reg.: MM
- Website: calinesti.ro

Călinești (Hungarian: Felsőkálinfalva or Felsőkálinfalu, Yiddish: קאלינשט, romanized: Kalinest) is a commune in Maramureș County, Maramureș, Romania. It is composed of three villages: Călinești, Cornești (Hungarian: Somosfalva), and Văleni (Hungarian: Mikolapatak, Yiddish: וואלען, romanized: Valeny).

Historical population
Year	Pop.	±%
1880	2,752	—
1900	3,115	+13.2%
1910	3,392	+8.9%
1930	3,638	+7.3%
1956	3,843	+5.6%
1977	3,728	−3.0%
1992	3,666	−1.7%
2002	3,410	−7.0%
2011	3,178	−6.8%
2021	3,049	−4.1%
Source: Census data

At the 2002 census, 99.8% of the 3,410 inhabitants were Romanians; 53.9% were Romanian Orthodox, 34.7% Greek-Catholic, 5.9% belonged to "another religion", and 4.5% were Pentecostal. At the 2021 census, Călinești had a population of 3,049; of those, 93.77% were Romanians.
