= Brebu Nou =

Brebu Nou Weidenthal
- Commune
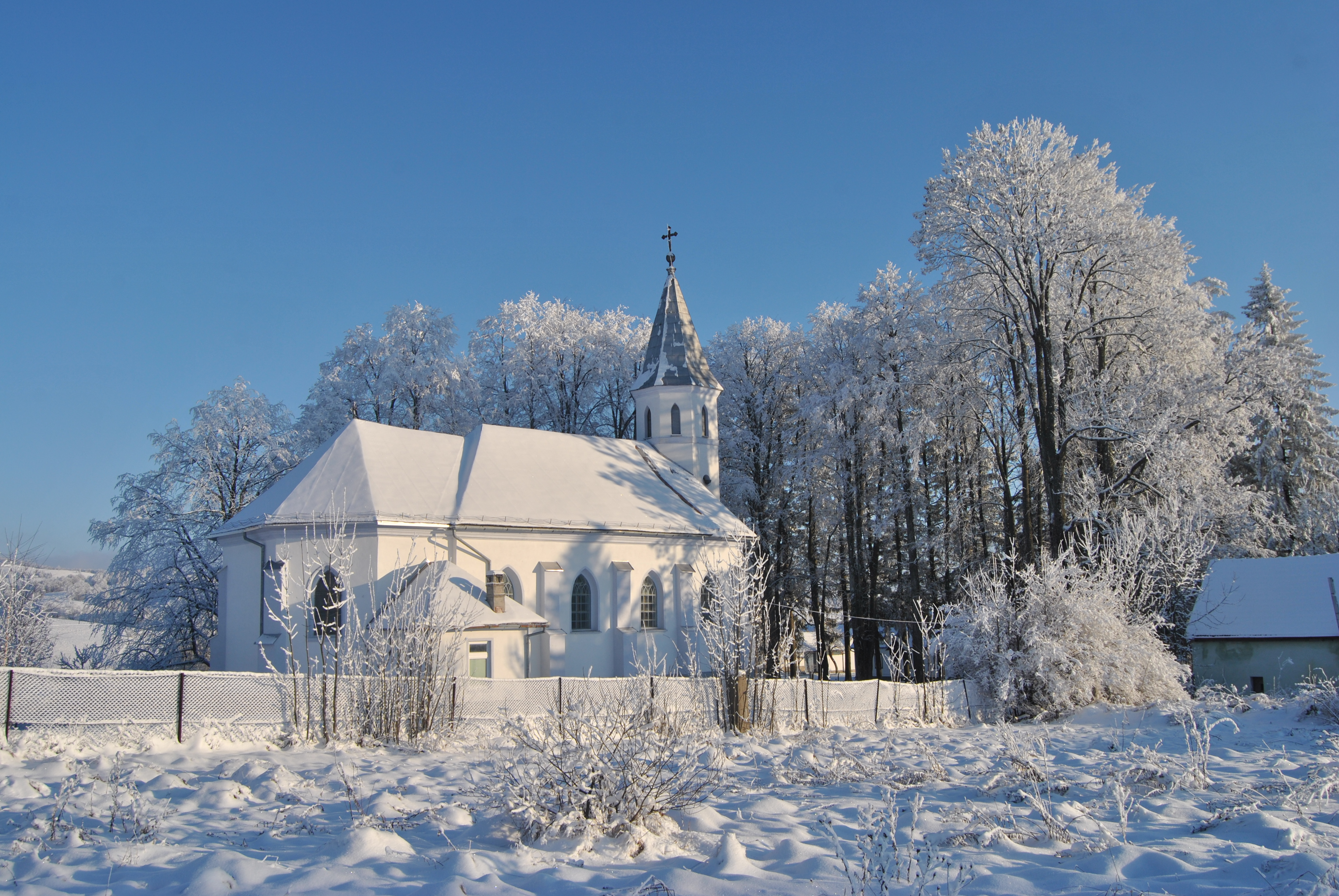
- Catholic church of Brebu Nou

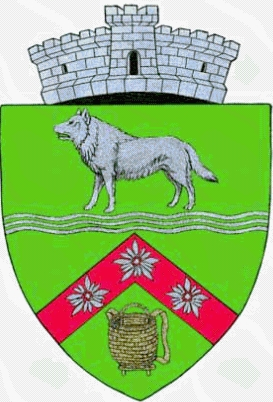
- Coat of arms

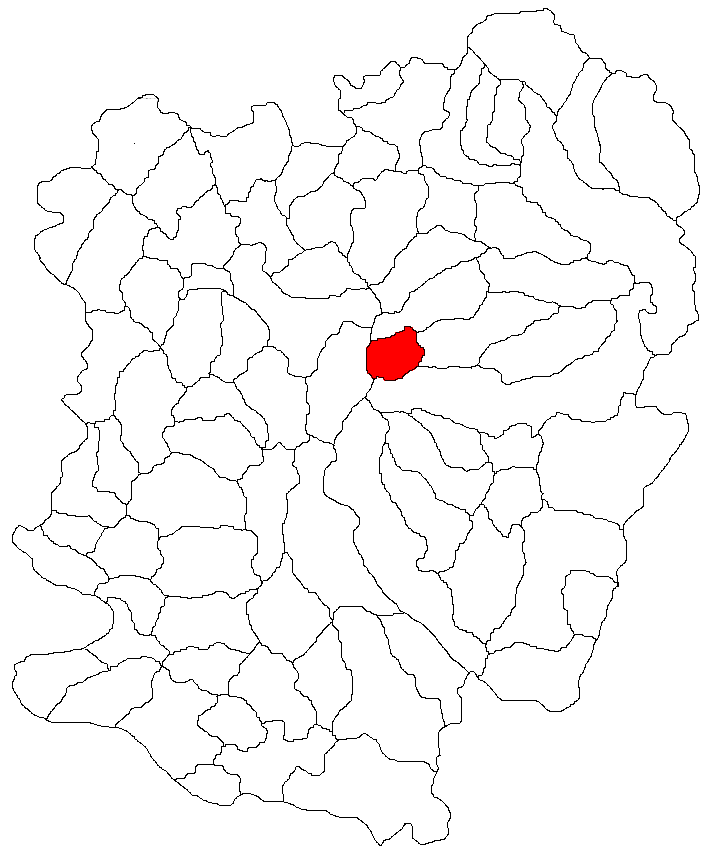
- Location in Caraș-Severin County

- Location in Romania
- Coordinates: 45°14′N 22°08′E
- Country: Romania
- County: Caraș-Severin

Government
  - Mayor (2024–2028): Iosif Gabriel Bordea (PSD)
- Area: 34.53 km^{2} (13.33 sq mi)
- Elevation: 820 m (2,690 ft)
- Population (2021-12-01): 166
  - Density: 4.81/km^{2} (12.5/sq mi)
- Time zone: UTC+02:00 (EET)
  - Summer (DST): UTC+03:00 (EEST)
- Postal code: 327051
- Area code: +(40) 0255
- Vehicle reg.: CS
- Website: primariabrebunou.ro

Brebu Nou (German: Weidenthal; Hungarian: Temesfő) is a commune in Caraș-Severin County, western Romania, with a population of 166 as of 2021. It is composed of two villages, Brebu Nou and Gărâna (Wolfsberg; Szörényordas; until 1924, Volfsberg in Romanian).

Historical population
Year	Pop.	±%
1880	1,520	—
1890	1,600	+5.3%
1910	2,006	+25.4%
1930	2,185	+8.9%
1941	2,193	+0.4%
1977	1,588	−27.6%
1992	142	−91.1%
2002	87	−38.7%
2011	119	+36.8%
2021	166	+39.5%
Source: Census data

At the 2011 census, the commune had 116 inhabitants; of those, 65.1% were Romanians, 30.2% Germans, and 4.7% Hungarians. At the 2021 census, the commune had a population of 166; of those, 68.67% were Romanians and 21.69% Germans. The villages were founded by German craftsmen from Bohemia.
