= Breboaia =

- Location within Romania

Location
- Country: Romania
- Counties: Maramureș County
- Villages: Breb

Physical characteristics
- Mouth: Mara
  - location: Hărnicești
  - coordinates: 47.7752°N 23.8810°E
- Length: 11 km (6.8 mi)
- Basin size: 27 km^{2} (10 sq mi)

Basin features
- Progression: Mara→ Iza→ Tisza→ Danube→ Black Sea
- Tributaries
  - left: Valea Caselor

The Breboaia is a right tributary of the Mara in Maramureș County, Romania. It discharges into the Mara in Hărnicești. Its length is 11 km (6.8 mi) and its basin size is 27 km^{2} (10 sq mi).
