= Mara (Iza) =

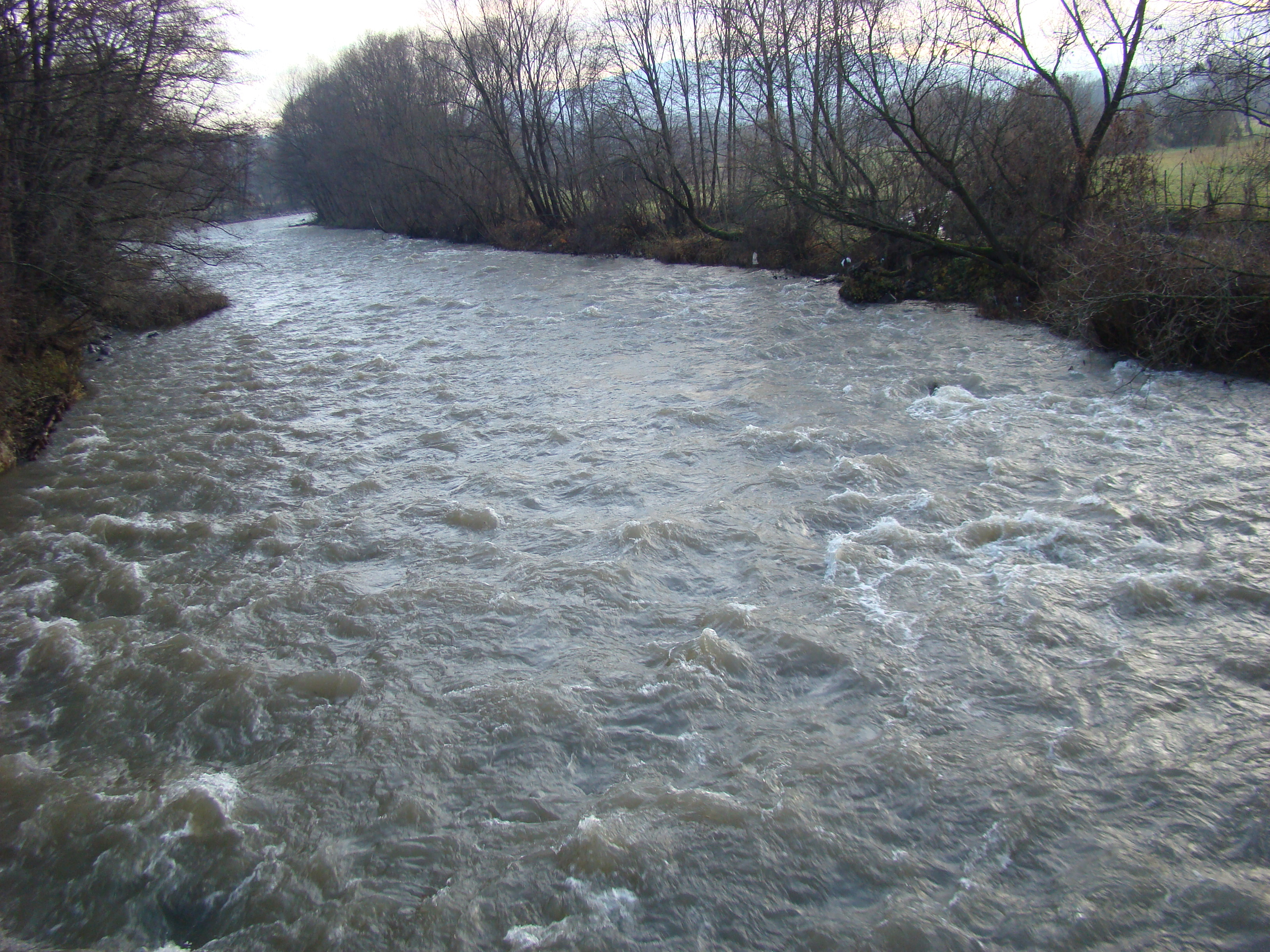

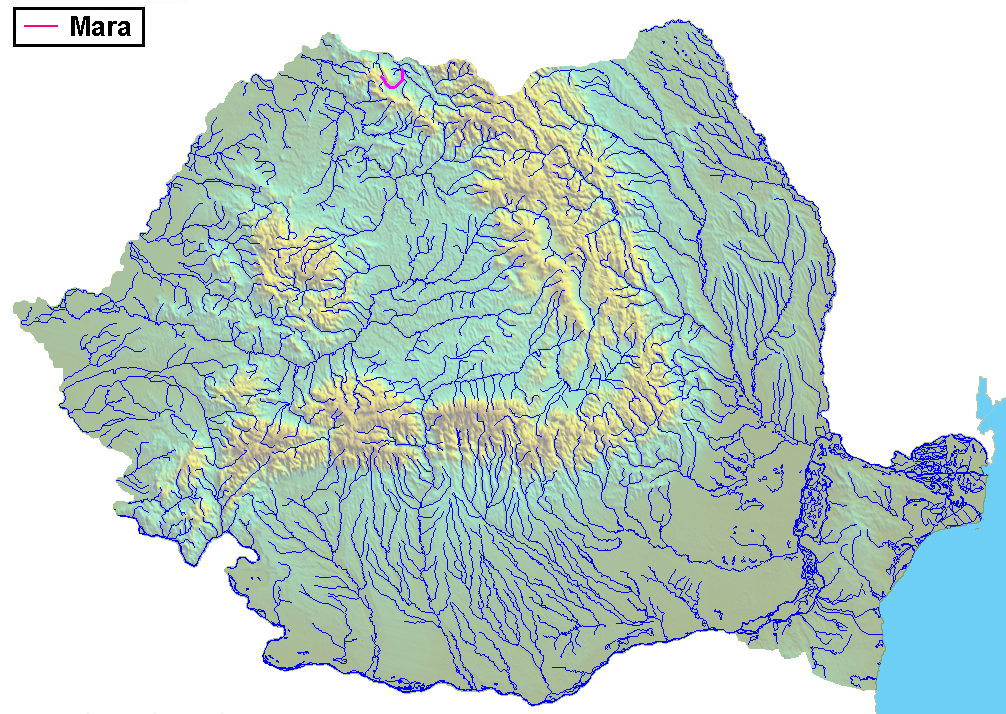

- Location within Romania

Location
- Country: Romania
- Counties: Maramureș County
- Villages: Desești, Sat-Șugatag, Giulești, Berbești, Vadu Izei

Physical characteristics
- Mouth: Iza
  - location: Vadu Izei
  - coordinates: 47.8911°N 23.9403°E
- Length: 38 km (24 mi)
- Basin size: 410 km^{2} (160 sq mi)

Basin features
- Progression: Iza→ Tisza→ Danube→ Black Sea
- Tributaries
  - right: Cosău

The Mara (Hungarian: Mára) is a left tributary of the river Iza in Romania. It discharges into the Iza in Vadu Izei. Its length is 38 km (24 mi) and its basin area is 410 km^{2} (160 sq mi). Its main tributary is the Cosău.

== Tributaries ==
The following rivers are tributaries to the river Mara:

- Left: Valea Seacă, Poiana, Lazu
- Right: Runc, Râuşor, Valea Mare, Breboaia, Cosău
