= Sighetu Marmației =

City in Maramureș County, Romania

- Municipality
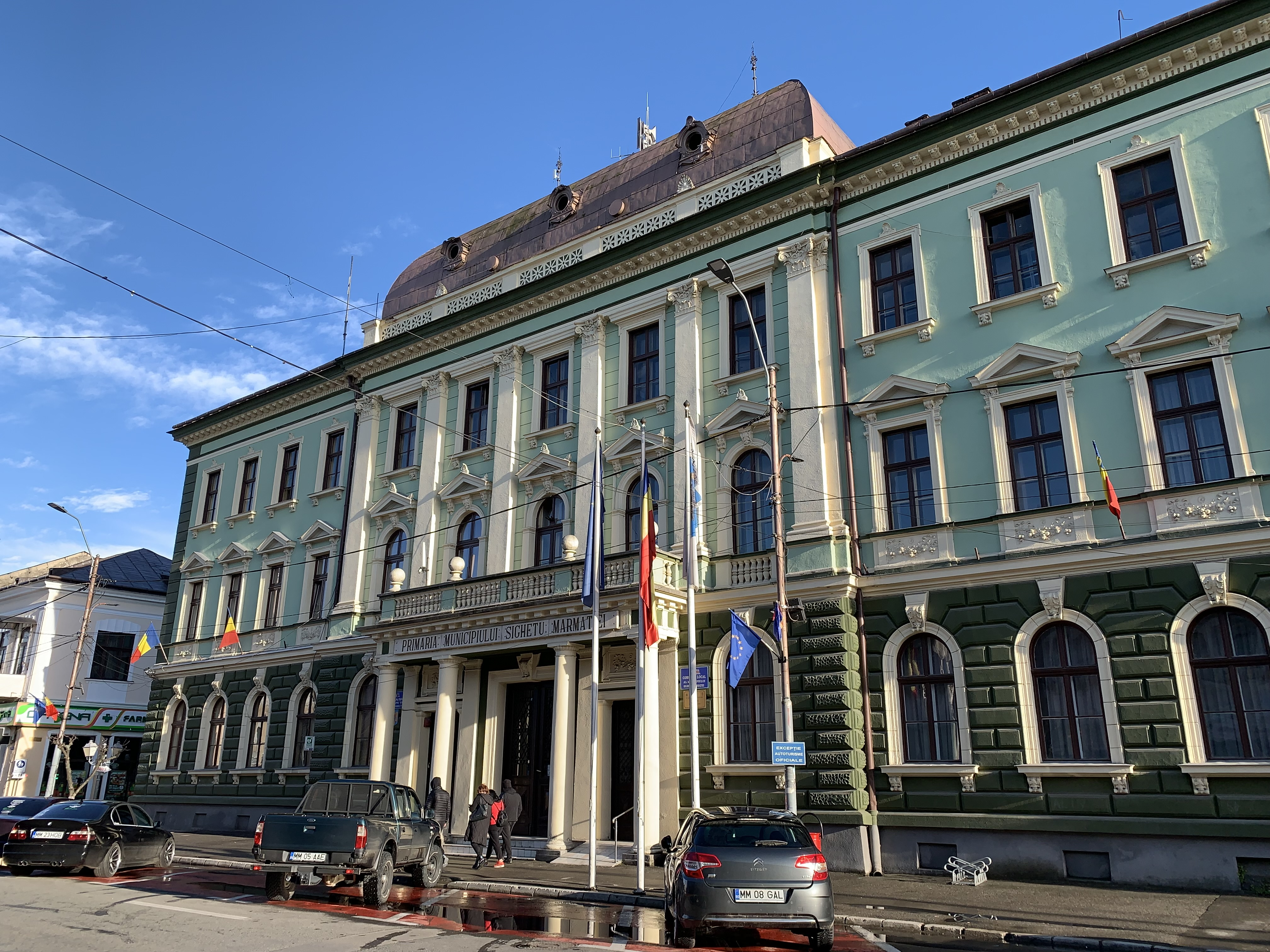
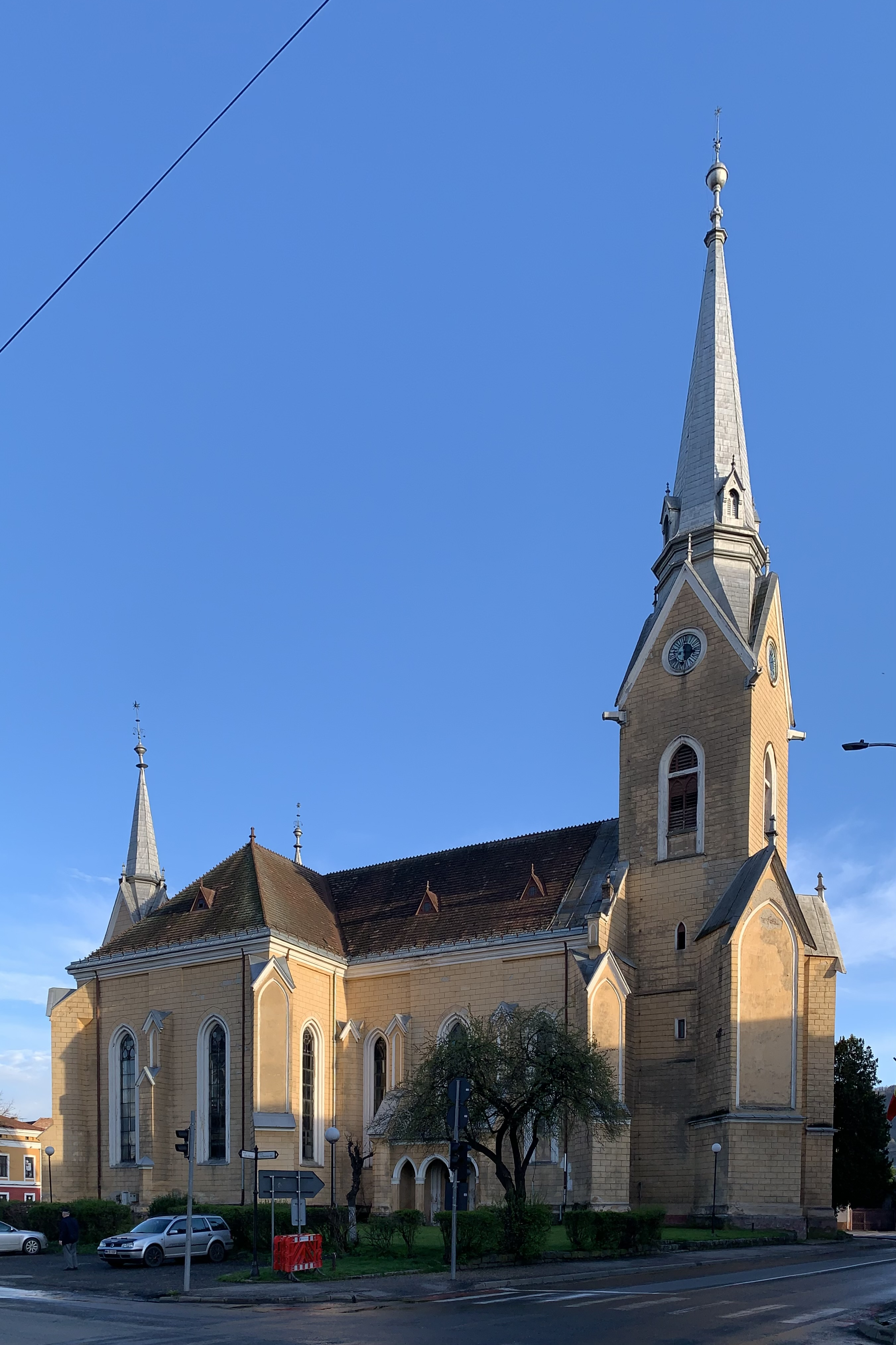
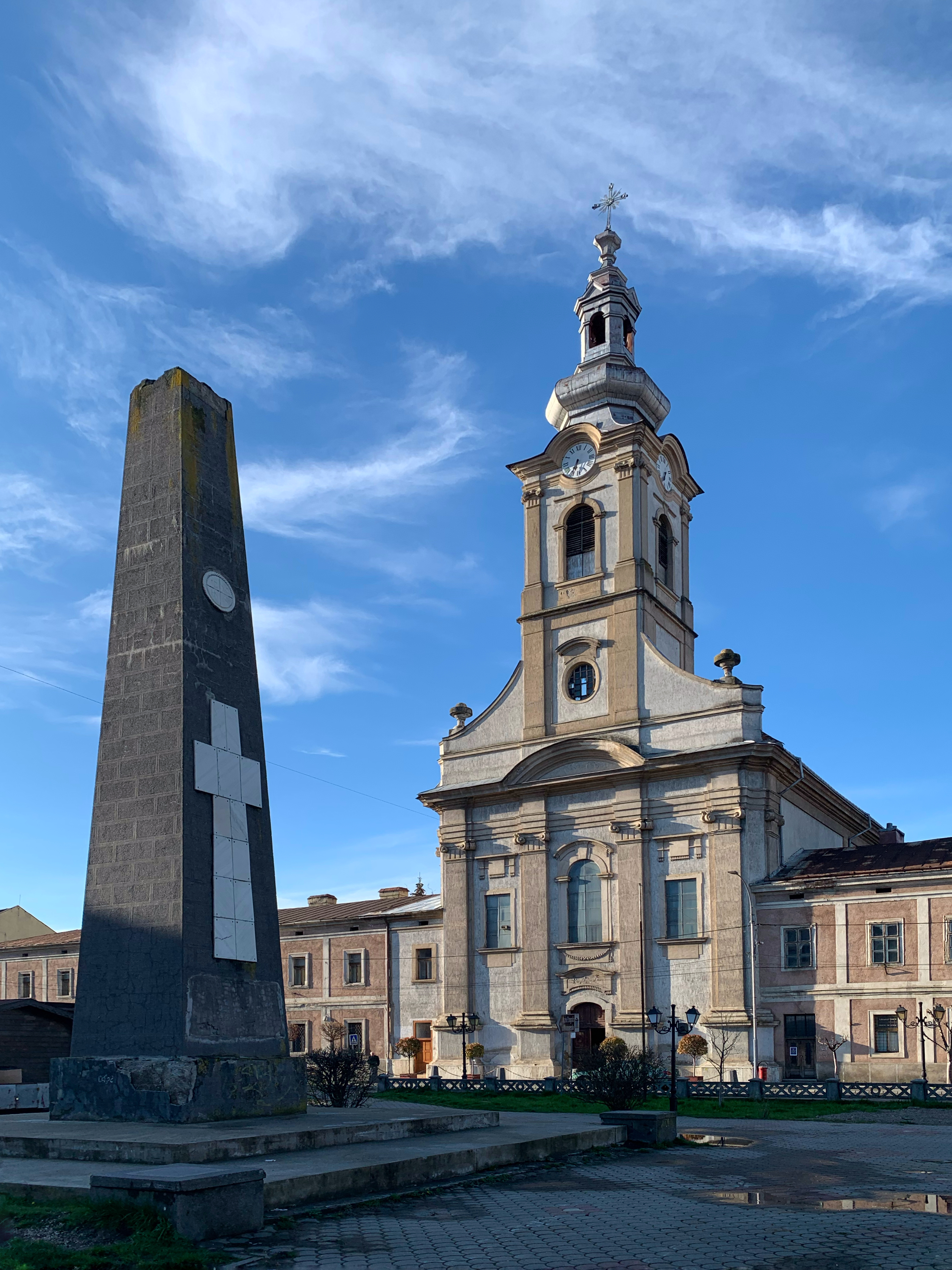
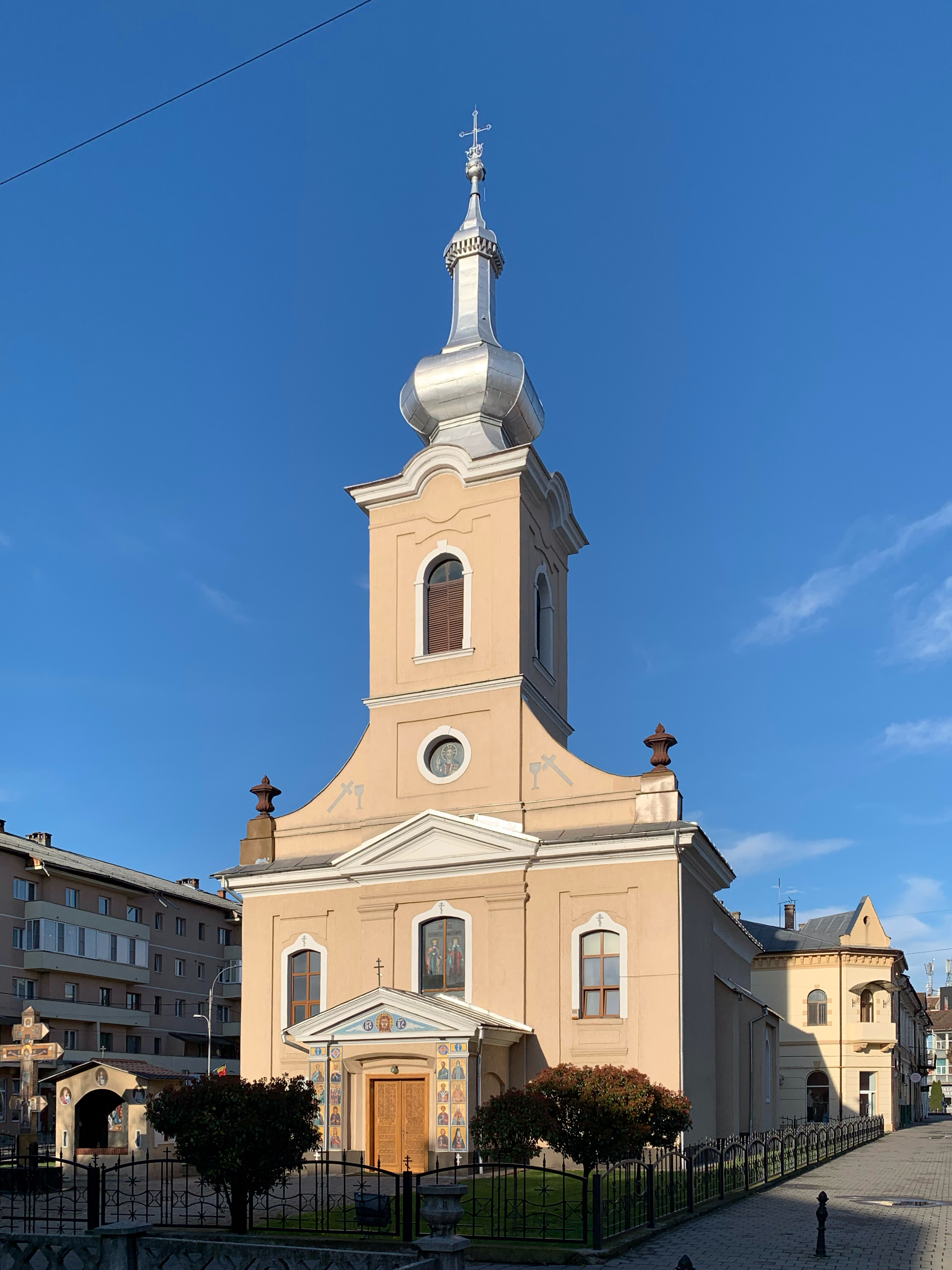
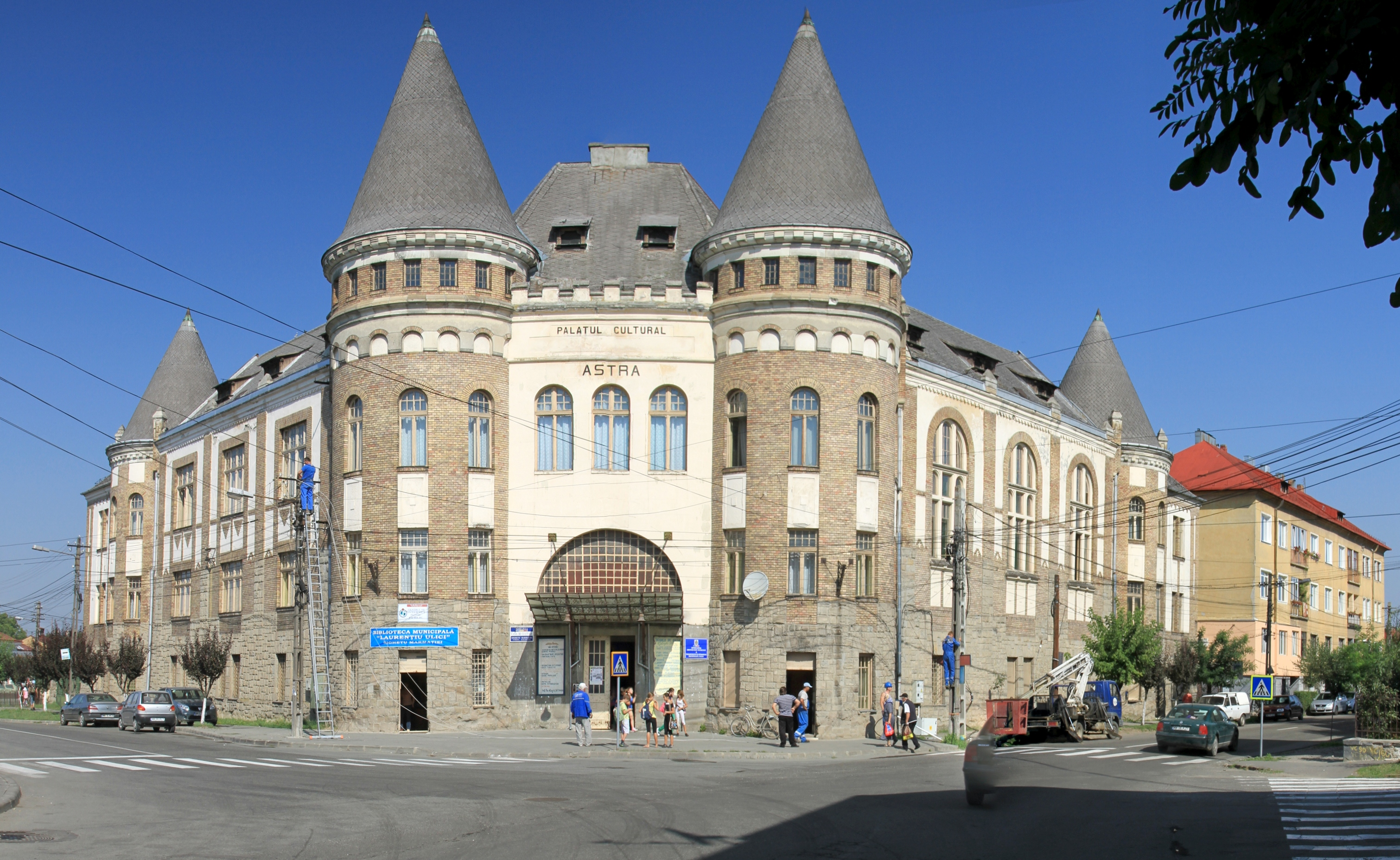
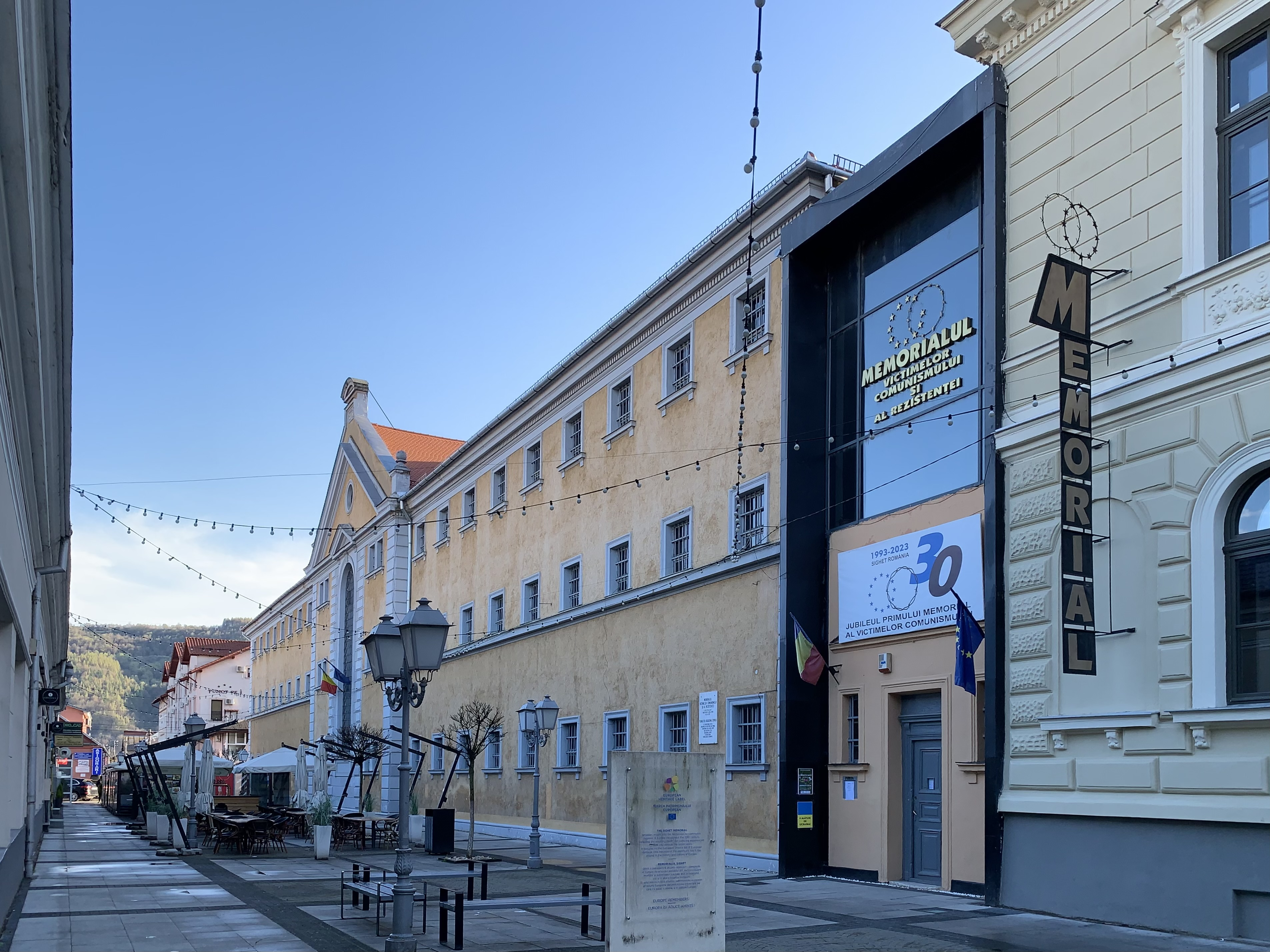
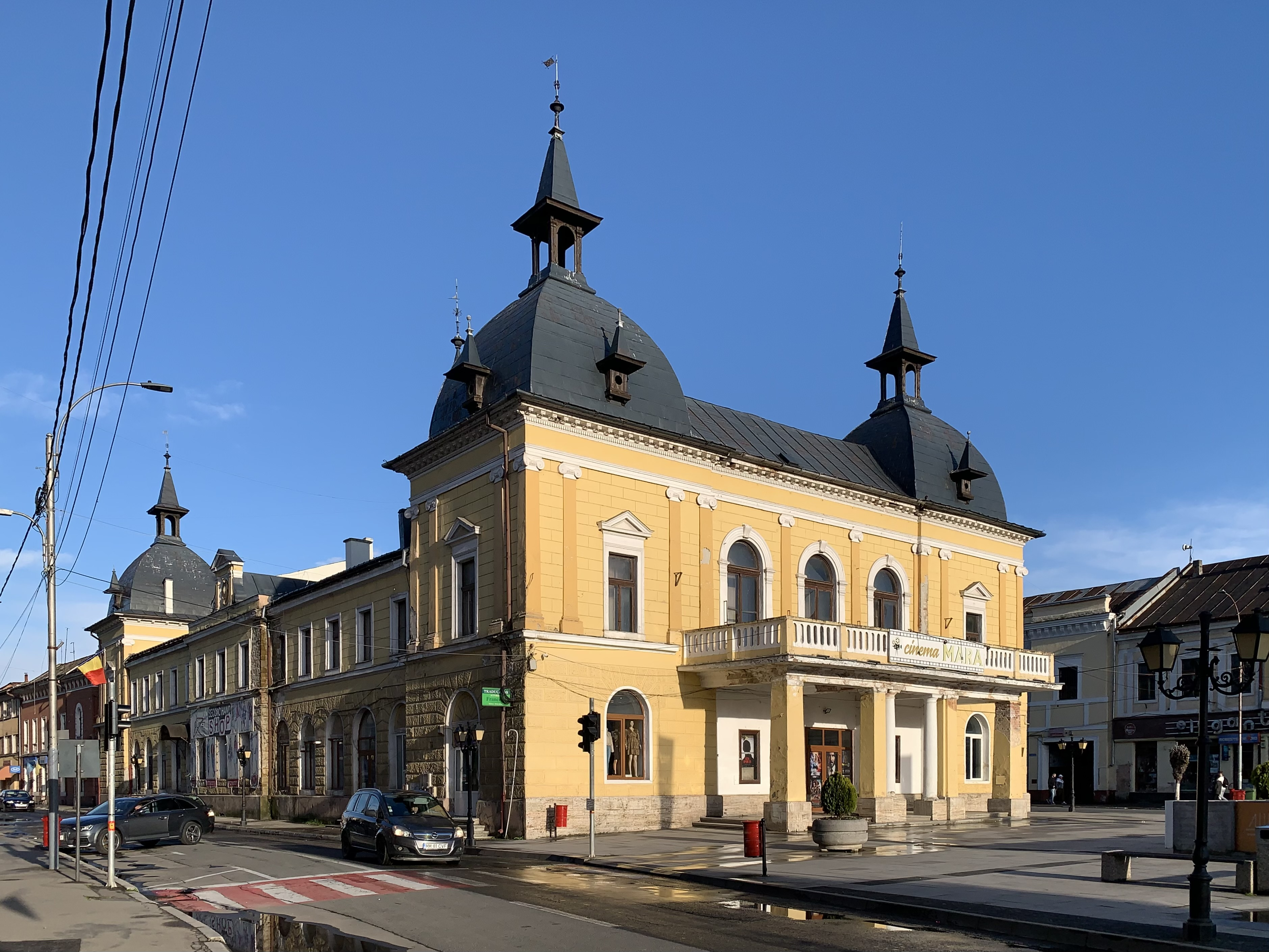
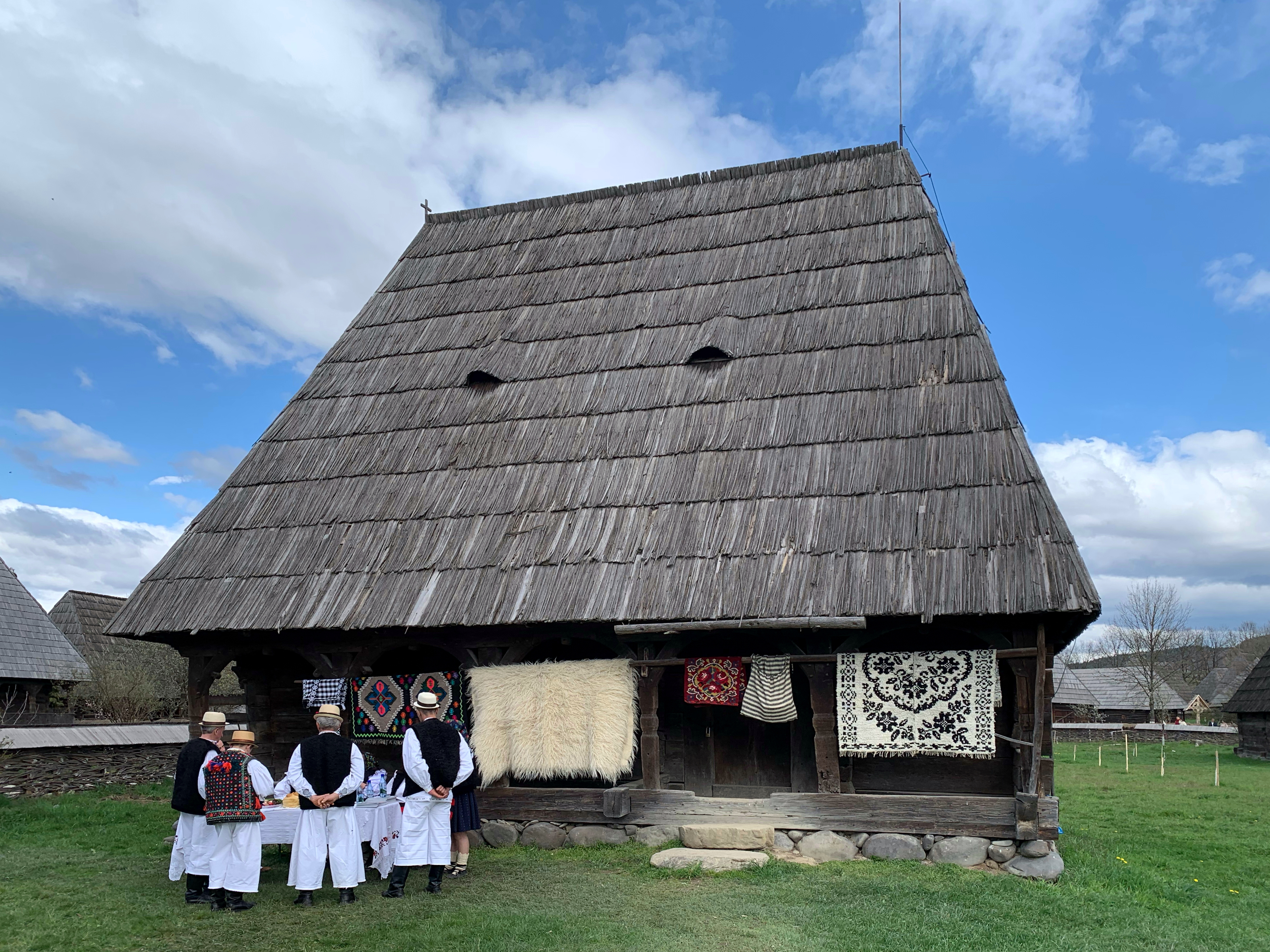
- Old Courthouse Reformed Church Piarist Monastery Ukrainian Church Palace of Culture Sighet Prison Memorial and Museum Cinema Mara Maramureș Village Museum

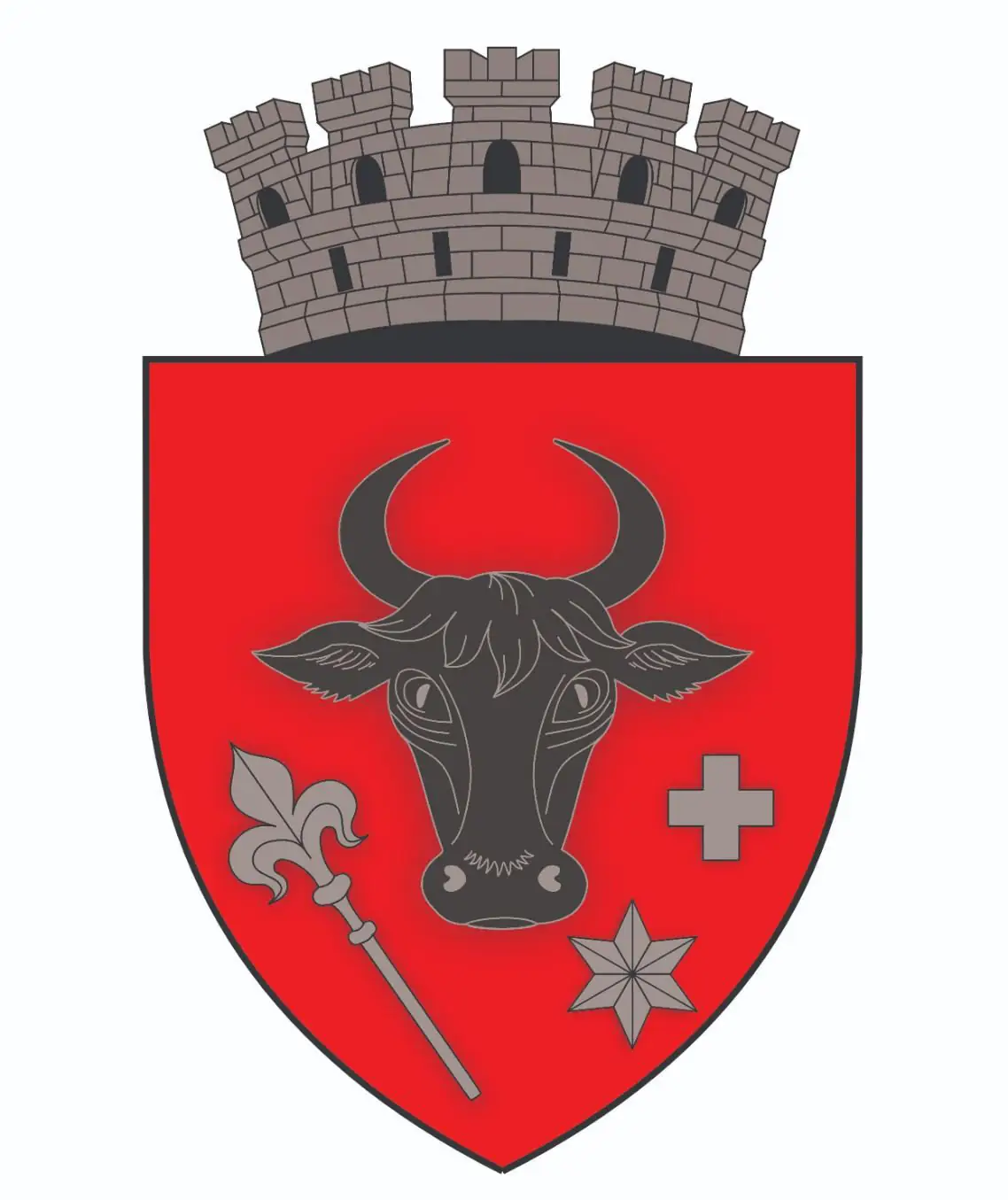
- Coat of arms

- Location in Maramureș County

- Location in Romania
- Coordinates: 47°55′43″N 23°53′33″E
- Country: Romania
- County: Maramureș

Government
  - Mayor (2024–2028): Vasile Moldovan (PSD)
- Area: 135.36 km^{2} (52.26 sq mi)
- Elevation: 274 m (899 ft)
- Population (2021-12-01): 32,793
  - Density: 242.27/km^{2} (627.46/sq mi)
- Time zone: UTC+02:00 (EET)
  - Summer (DST): UTC+03:00 (EEST)
- Postal code: 435500
- Area code: (+40) 02 62
- Vehicle reg.: MM
- Website: primaria-sighet.ro

Sighetu Marmației (Romanian pronunciation: [ˌsiɡetu marˈmat͡si.ej], also spelled Sighetul Marmației; German: Marmaroschsiget or Siget; Hungarian: Máramarossziget, Hungarian pronunciation: [ˈmaːrɒmɒroʃsiɡɛt]; Ukrainian: Сигіт, romanized: Syhit; Yiddish: סיגעט, romanized: Siget), until 1960 Sighet, is a city in Maramureș County near the Iza River, in northwestern Romania.

== Geography ==
Sighetu Marmației is situated along the Tisa river on the border with Ukraine, across from the Ukrainian town of Solotvyno. Neighboring communities include: Sarasău, Săpânța, Câmpulung la Tisa, Ocna Șugatag, Giulești, Vadu Izei, Rona de Jos and Bocicoiu Mare communities in Romania, Bila Tserkva community and the Solotvyno township in Ukraine (Zakarpattia Oblast). The city administers five villages: Iapa (Kabolapatak), Lazu Baciului (Bácsiláz), Șugău (Sugó), Valea Cufundoasă (Mélypatak) and Valea Hotarului (Határvölgy).

== Demographics ==
Historical population
Year	Pop.	±%
1880	10,852	—
1890	14,758	+36.0%
1900	17,445	+18.2%
1910	21,370	+22.5%
1920	23,691	+10.9%
1930	27,270	+15.1%
1948	18,329	−32.8%
1956	22,361	+22.0%
1966	29,771	+33.1%
1977	38,146	+28.1%
1992	44,185	+15.8%
2002	41,246	−6.7%
2011	37,640	−8.7%
2021	32,793	−12.9%
Source: Census data

According to the 1910 census, the city had 21,370 inhabitants; these consisted of 17,542 (82.1%) Hungarian speakers, 2,002 (9.4%) Romanian, 1,257 (5.9%) German, and 32 Ruthenian speakers. The number of Jews was 7,981; they were included in the Hungarian and German language groups. There were 5,850 Greek Catholics and 4,901 Roman Catholics. According to a 1920 estimate, the city had 23,691 inhabitants, 11,026 being Jews, 6,552 Hungarians, 4,964 Romanians, 149 Germans, and 1,000 of other ethnicities. The 1930 census numbered 27,270 inhabitants, 10,526 of them being Jews, 9,658 Romanians, 5,424 Hungarians, 1,221 Ukrainians, and 441 of other ethnicities.

At the 2011 census, the city had 37,640 inhabitants; of those, 76.07% were Romanians, 11.73% Hungarians, 1.99% Ukrainians, and 1.3% Roma. At the 2021 census, Sighetu Marmației had a population of 32,793; of those, 71.11% were Romanians, 8.45% Hungarians, 1.58% Ukrainians, and 1.31% Roma.

== Etymology ==
The municipality's name derives from Hungarian name which means "island in Máramaros". According to the legend, the place name comes from the Hungarian expression "mára már rossz" (too bad by now), referring to that the local tribes moved to Moldavia.

Inhabitants simply call the city Sighet and similar abbreviations in their mother tongue.

== History ==
Inhabited since the Hallstatt period, the populated area lies in the Tisza Valley, an important route as being the only access to the otherwise mountainous, sparsely populated region. After 895 in the 10th century the area became part of Kingdom of Hungary. The first mention of a settlement dates back to the 11th century, and the city as such was first mentioned in 1326. In 1352, it was a free royal town and the capital of Máramaros comitatus, just outside Transylvania.

After the defeat at the Battle of Mohács and the death of Louis II of Hungary, in the ensuing struggle for the Hungarian throne, the kingdom was divided into Royal Hungary of Habsburg Ferdinand I, Holy Roman Emperor and the Eastern Hungarian Kingdom of John Zápolya the Voivode of Transylvania. In 1570 the Principality of Transylvania was formed which included Máramaros County. Transylvania, including Maramureș, became an autonomous principality within the Ottoman Empire from 1541. In 1711, King Charles III returned Máramaros County to his Hungarian domain.

During World War I, the city was briefly occupied by Russian forces between 3 - 7 October 1914. 1918 saw the dissolution of the Austro-Hungarian Monarchy. On November 22, 1918, in an assembly of Romanians from Maramureș took place in the town's central square, electing a national council and deciding to send a delegation to the Great National Assembly of Alba Iulia, which voted the union of Transylvania with Romania. The Romanian Army took control of the area in the spring of 1919, during the Hungarian–Romanian War. The Allied Powers accepted the Romanian demands and Transylvania including Máramaros County was formally ceded to the Kingdom of Romania in the Treaty of Trianon in June 1920.

In 1919, six Romanian schools opened in Sighet: a boys' high school, a girls' high school, a boys' elementary school, a co-ed commercial gymnasium, and two commercial high schools (one for boys, the other for girls). The Maramureș ethnographic museum opened in the cultural palace in 1926. During the interwar period, over twenty newspapers appeared in the town, as well as a number of literary reviews. In August 1940, the Second Vienna Award, arbitrated by Germany and Italy, reassigned the territory of Northern Transylvania from Romania to Hungary. As a result, Sighetu Marmației came under Hungarian administration during World War II.

A first deportation of Jews from Sighet took place in 1941. The second occurred after Passover 1944, so that by April, the town's ghetto contained close to 13,000 Jews from Sighet itself and the neighboring places of Dragomirești, Ocna Șugatag, and Vișeu de Sus. Between May 16 and 22, the ghetto was liquidated in four transports, with its inhabitants sent to Auschwitz concentration camp. Among the deportees was Sighet native and future Nobel Peace Prize laureate Elie Wiesel. In 1947, there were some 2,300 Jews in Sighet, including survivors and a considerable number of Jews from other parts of Romania. By 2002, the town had 20 remaining Jews.

Towards the end of World War II, the city was taken back from Hungarian and German troops by Romanian and Soviet forces in October 1944. The Paris Peace Treaties of 1947 voided the Vienna Awards, and reaffirmed the Trianon borders.

In 1948, the new Communist regime nationalized the city's factories, three publishing houses and banks. In 1950, with the counties replaced by regions, Sighet lost its status as an administrative center and became part of the Maramureș Region. In 1960, the building of neighborhoods with apartment blocks began. The same year, the town's name became Sighetul Marmației; the final “l” was dropped in 1968, when the city became once again part of Maramureș County. 1962 saw the opening of a wood processing factory (Combinatul de Industrializare a Lemnului). Turning out furniture and other wood products, the enterprise had over 6,000 employees and played an important part in the city's economic development. After the Romanian Revolution of 1989, it gradually fell upon hard times, with nine private firms employing some 3,500 in 2012. A second important employer during the Communist period was a textile factory.

In May 2014, a commemoration was held in honour of the 70th anniversary of the deportations in May 1944. Events included a Klezmer concert, Sabbath services in the one remaining synagogue, a memorial service at the Holocaust Monument at the site of the deportations, as well as an exhibit on life in Sighet prior to the deportations. The exhibit contained contributions by survivors and their families. Additionally, visits were organized to the Jewish Cemetery as well as the Holocaust Museum located in the childhood home of Elie Wiesel. On 3 August 2018, Wiesel's birthplace was vandalized.

A bridge between Sighetu Marmației and the village of Bila Tserkva in Ukraine was inaugurated on 8 October 2026, providing the Romanian community in Zakarpattia Oblast a direct connection with Romania and with relatives across the border.

== Sighet Prison ==
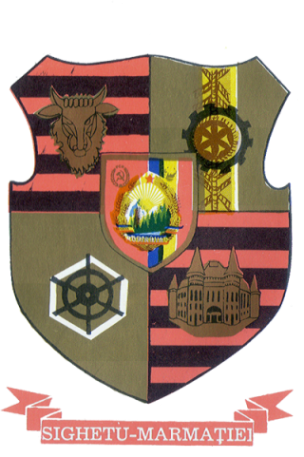
Coat of arms during the Socialist Republic

After the establishment of the Romanian communist regime, the Securitate ran the Sighet Prison during the 1950s and 1960s as a place for the detention and political repression of public figures who had been declared "class enemies." The most prominent of these was the former prime minister Iuliu Maniu, who died in the prison in 1953. The former prison is operated as a museum, part of the Memorial of the Victims of Communism and of the Resistance.

== International relations ==
=== Twin towns — Sister cities ===
Sighetu Marmației is twinned with:

- Khust, Ukraine
- Oława, Poland
- Kolomyia, Ukraine
- Naples, Italy
- Kiryat Yam, Israel

== Notable inhabitants ==
- Marius Bilașco (born 1981), footballer
- Dumitru Cernicica (1915–2004), Hungarian-born Romanian and Hungarian communist politician and engineer
- Livia Fränkel (née Szmuk; 1927–2025), Swedish-Romanian-Hungarian Holocaust survivor
- Géza Frid (1904–1989), Hungarian–Dutch composer and pianist
- Hédi Fried (née Szmuk; 1924–2022), Swedish-Romanian-Hungarian Holocaust survivor, author, and psychologist
- John Gassner 1903–1967), Hungarian-born American theater historian, critic, educator, and anthologist, Yale University professor
- Zoltan Harmat (born "Stern"; 1900–1985), Israeli architect
- Simon Hollósy (1857–1918), Hungarian painter
- Monica Iagăr (born 1973), high jumper
- Alexandru Ivasiuc (1933–1977), novelist
- György Jakubinyi (born 1946), former archbishop of the Roman Catholic Archdiocese of Alba Iulia
- Herman Kahan (1926–2020), Romanian-born Norwegian Holocaust survivor, businessman, rabbi, and author
- Michel Klein (1921–2024), Romanian-born French veterinarian
- Amos Manor (1918–2007), Romanian-born Israeli Holocaust survivor, Director of the Shin Bet (Israel's internal intelligence and security service)
- Gisella Perl (1907–1988), Romanian-American-Israeli Holocaust survivor, gynecologist
- Kornélia Prielle (1826–1906), Hungarian stage actress
- Edmond Bordeaux Szekely (1905–1979), Hungarian philologist, philosopher, and psychologist
- Joel Teitelbaum (1887–1979), founder and first Grand Rebbe of the Satmar dynasty
- Moshe Teitelbaum (1914–2006), Hasidic rebbe and the world leader of the Satmar Hasidim
- Yekusiel Yehuda Teitelbaum (II) (1911–1944), Chief Rabbi of Sighet
- Simon Ungar (1864–1942), doctor of oriental medicine and rabbi
- Elie Wiesel (1928–2016), Romanian-born American writer, professor, political activist, Nobel Peace Prize laureate, and Holocaust survivor
- Ludovic Bruckstein, Munkacs-born writer, and Holocaust survivor.

== See also ==
- Night, a 1960 memoir by Elie Wiesel

== Image gallery ==
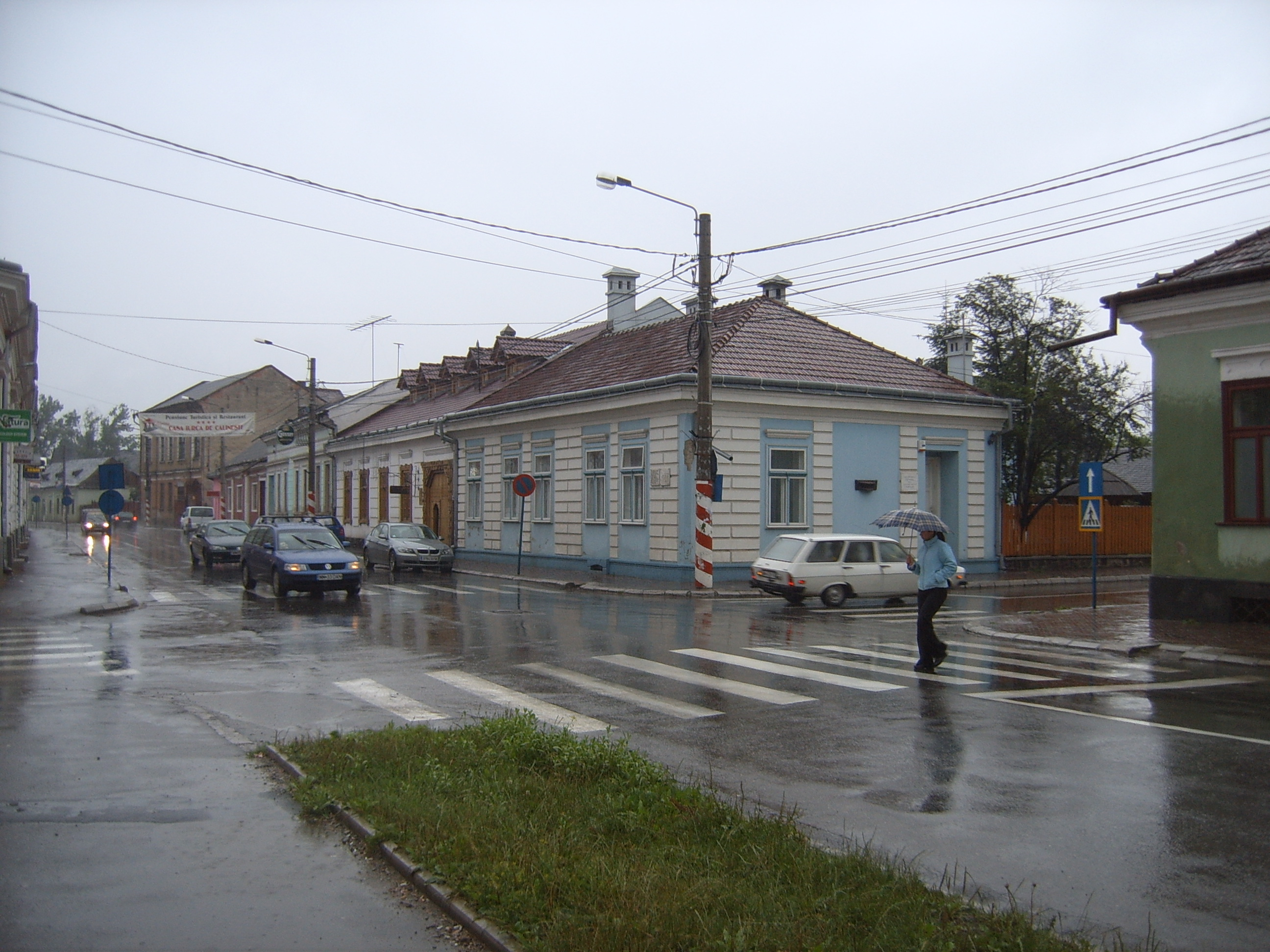
Elie Wiesel's house in Sighet

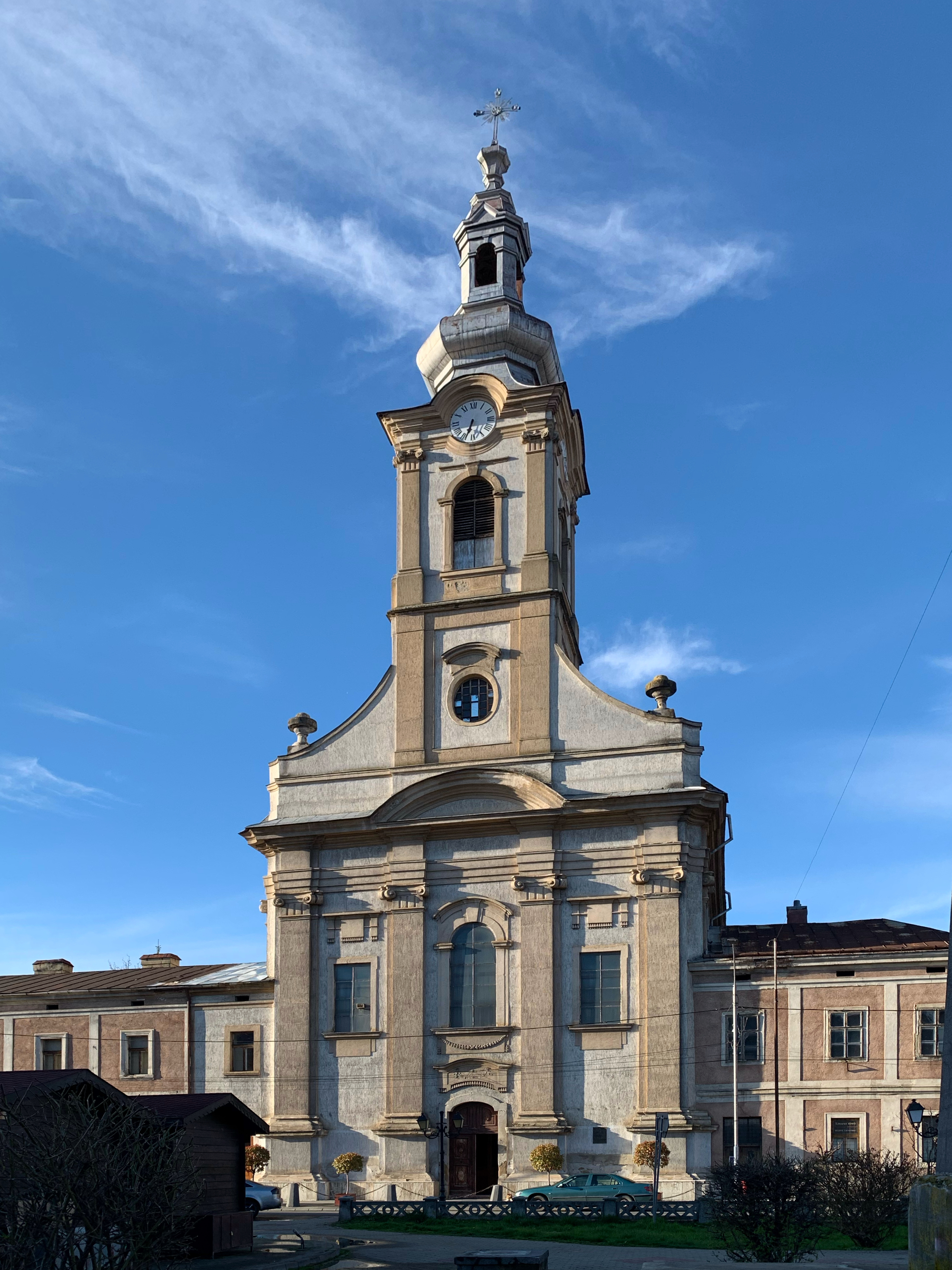
Roman Catholic church

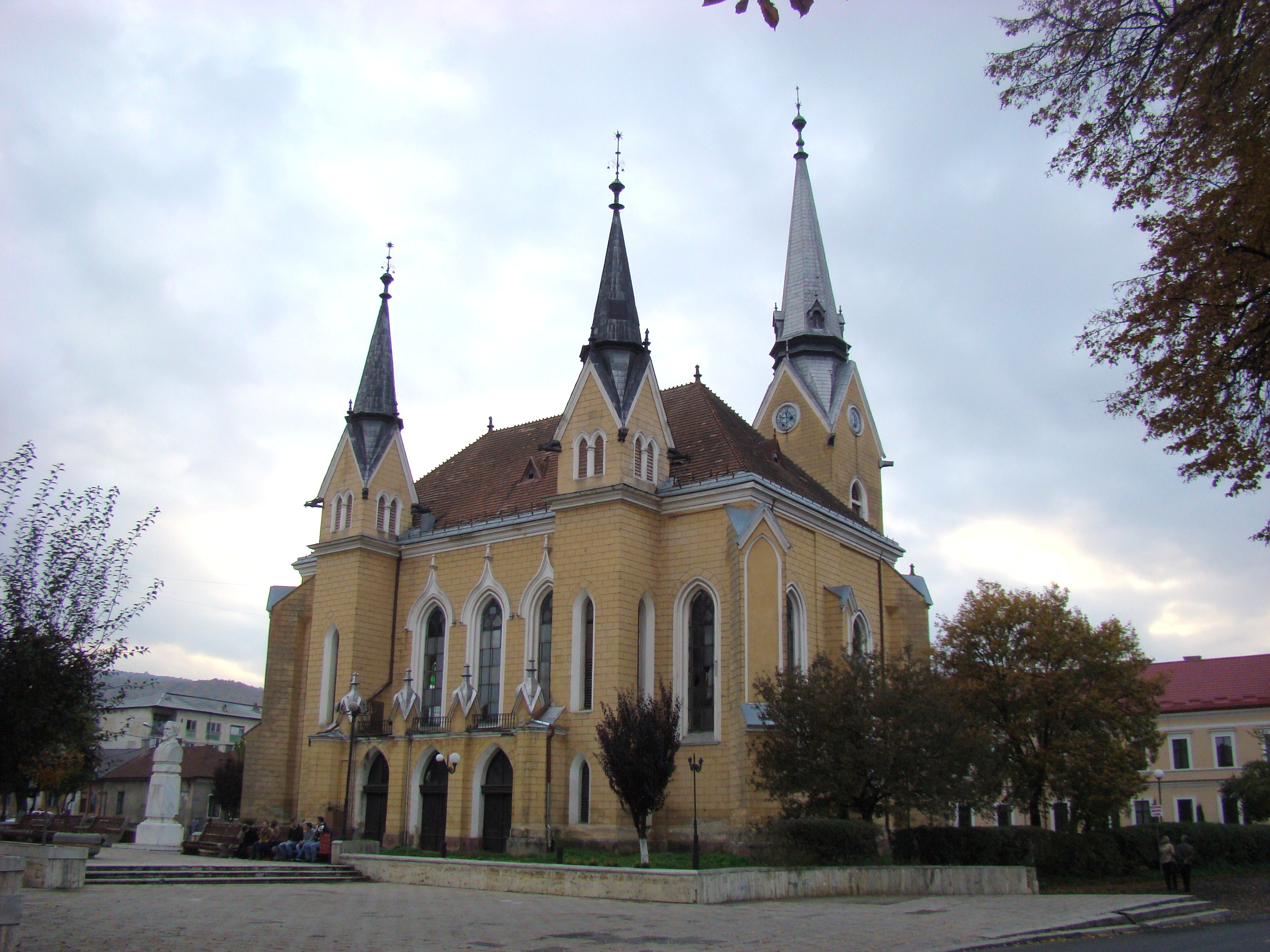
Reformed church

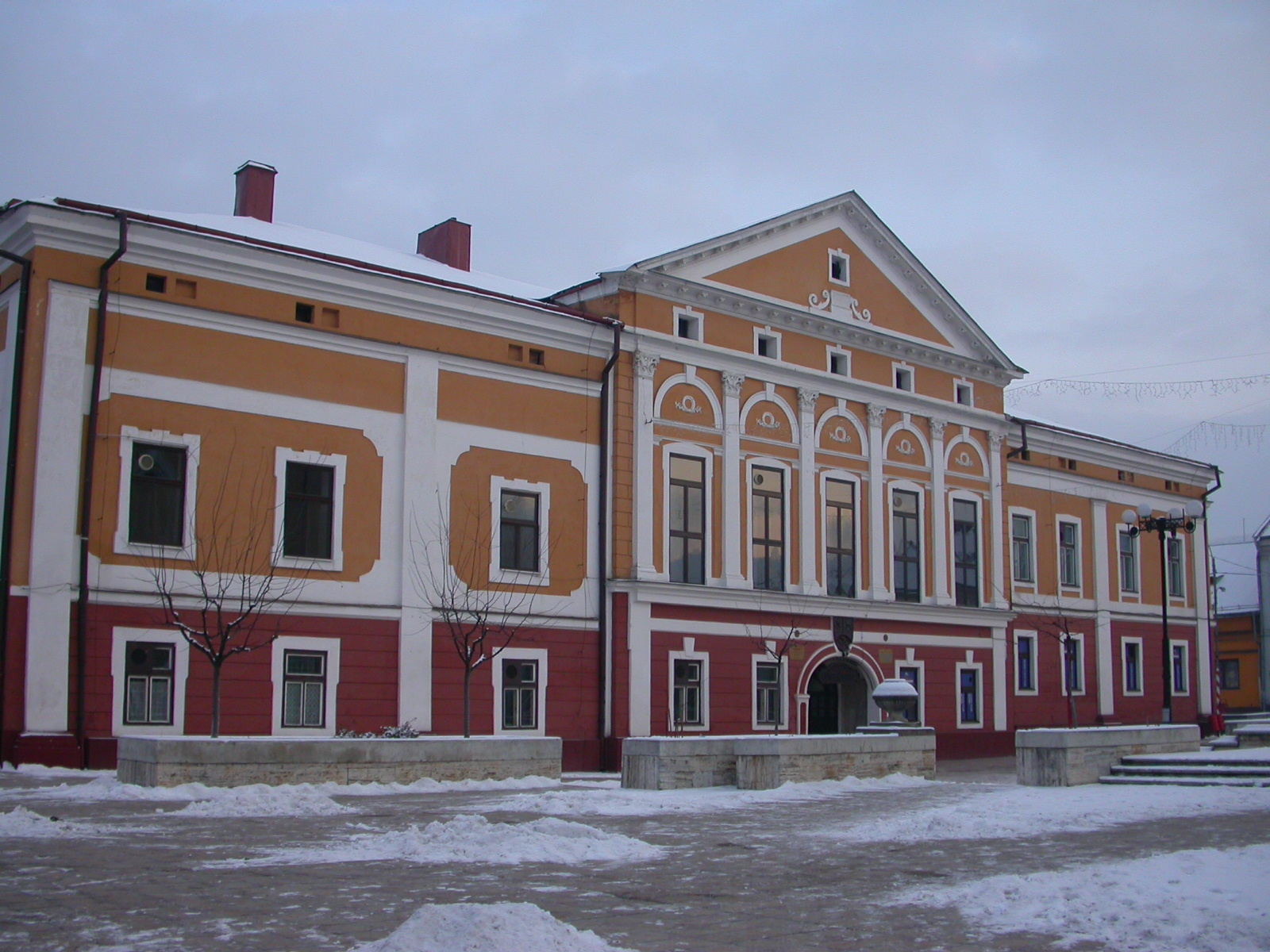
Former prefecture building

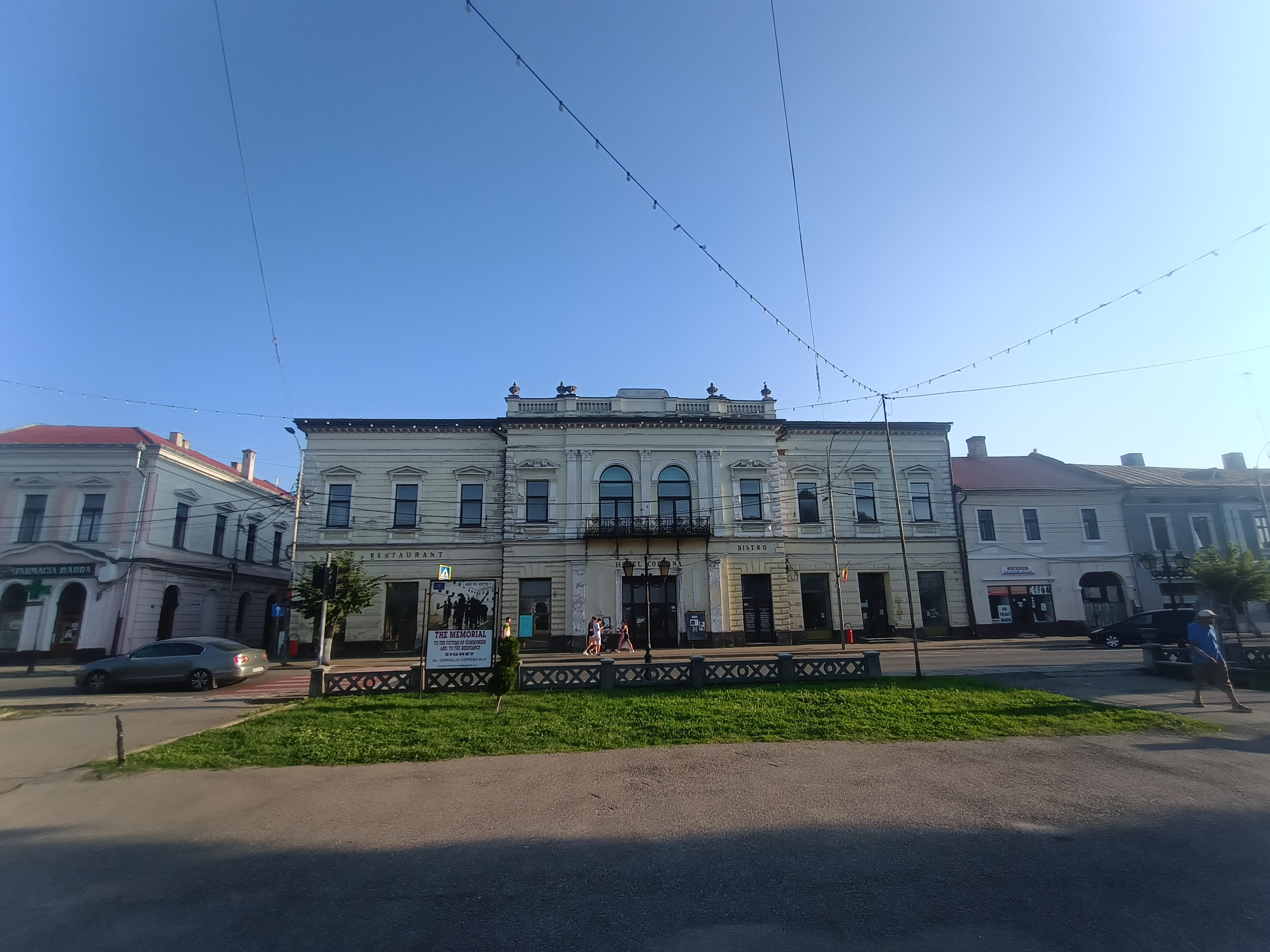
Former Hotel Coroana

Groedel-villa
