= Ocna Șugatag =

- Commune
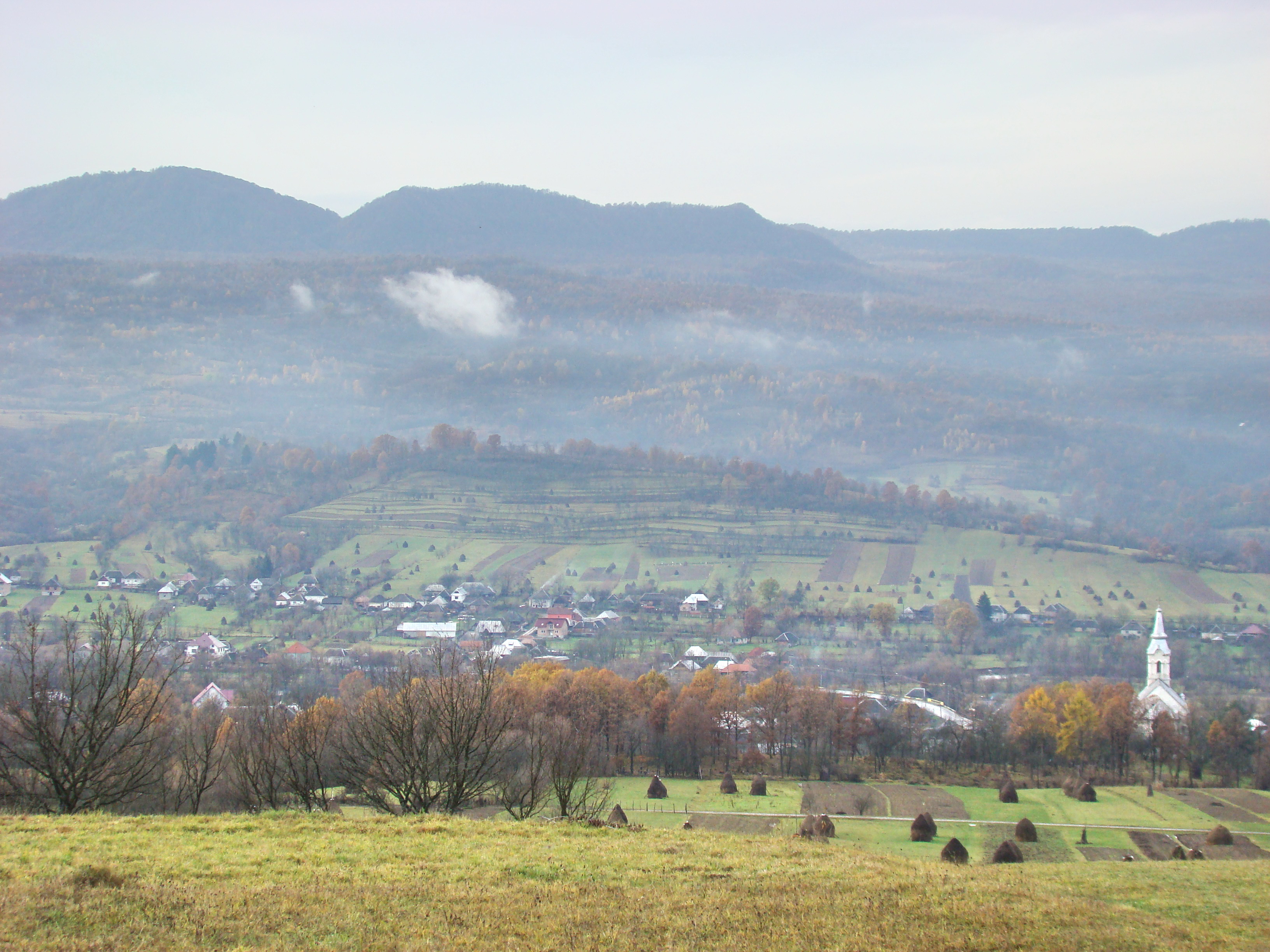
- View of Ocna Șugatag village

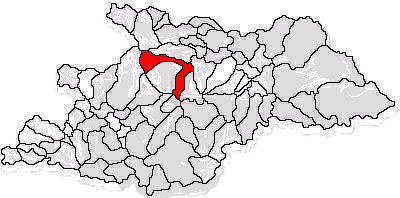
- Location in Maramureș County

- Location in Romania
- Coordinates: 47°47′N 23°56′E
- Country: Romania
- County: Maramureș
- Subdivisions: Breb, Hoteni, Ocna Șugatag, Sat-Șugatag

Government
  - Mayor (2020–2024): Ioan Oanea (CMM)
- Area: 85.20 km^{2} (32.90 sq mi)
- Elevation: 490 m (1,610 ft)
- Population (2021-12-01): 3,617
  - Density: 42.45/km^{2} (110.0/sq mi)
- Time zone: UTC+02:00 (EET)
  - Summer (DST): UTC+03:00 (EEST)
- Postal code: 437205
- Area code: (+40) 02 62
- Vehicle reg.: MM
- Website: primariaocnasugatag.ro

Ocna Șugatag (Hungarian: Aknasugatag, Yiddish: אוקנה-שוגאטאג, romanized: Okna Sugatag, Ukrainian: Окна-Шугатаг) is a commune in Maramureș County, Maramureș, Romania. It is composed of four villages: Breb (Hungarian: Bréb), Hoteni (Hungarian: Hotinka), Ocna Șugatag, and Sat-Șugatag (Hungarian: Falusugatag).

== Geography ==
The commune is located in the central-north part of Maramureș County, 19 km (12 mi) south of Sighetu Marmației and 50 km (31 mi) northeast of the county seat, Baia Mare. It is situated at an altitude of 490 m (1,610 ft), in a hilly region on the eastern slopes of the Gutin Mountains, on the banks of the river Mara.

A spa resort, Ocna Șugatag is well known for its salt water. It is home to Lake Gavril, which covers an area of over 2 hectares (4.9 acres) and has a depth of about 30 m (98 ft). Formed by the collapse of a salt mine more than 60 years ago, the lake is known for its anthropomorphic shape and for the fact that at the top it has a layer of fresh water, and at the bottom a layer of salt water.

== Demographics ==
Historical population
Year	Pop.	±%
1880	4,020	—
1900	4,818	+19.9%
1910	5,079	+5.4%
1930	4,884	−3.8%
1956	4,355	−10.8%
1977	4,555	+4.6%
1992	4,566	+0.2%
2002	4,207	−7.9%
2011	3,853	−8.4%
2021	3,617	−6.1%
Source: Census data

At the 2011 census, Ocna Șugatag had 3,853 inhabitants; of those, 89.2% were Romanians, 8.3% Hungarians, and 2.3% Roma. At the 2021 census, the commune had a population of 3,617, of which 84.32% were Romanians, 5.2% Hungarians, and 3.12% Roma.

== Natives ==
- Marga Barbu (1929 – 2009), actress
- Maria Ficzay (born 1991), women's football player
- Béla Zsedényi (1894 – 1955), Hungarian jurist and politician

== Climate ==
Climate data for Ocna Șugatag (1991–2020)
Month	Jan	Feb	Mar	Apr	May	Jun	Jul	Aug	Sep	Oct	Nov	Dec	Year
Record high °C (°F)	16.1 (61.0)	18.0 (64.4)	24.4 (75.9)	29.2 (84.6)	30.0 (86.0)	34.1 (93.4)	35.2 (95.4)	35.8 (96.4)	33.7 (92.7)	28.4 (83.1)	26.4 (79.5)	15.7 (60.3)	35.8 (96.4)
Mean daily maximum °C (°F)	1.6 (34.9)	3.8 (38.8)	8.6 (47.5)	15.3 (59.5)	20.2 (68.4)	23.5 (74.3)	25.1 (77.2)	25.4 (77.7)	20.0 (68.0)	14.7 (58.5)	8.7 (47.7)	2.4 (36.3)	14.1 (57.4)
Daily mean °C (°F)	−2.2 (28.0)	−0.7 (30.7)	3.3 (37.9)	9.3 (48.7)	14.1 (57.4)	17.5 (63.5)	19.0 (66.2)	18.9 (66.0)	13.8 (56.8)	9.0 (48.2)	4.3 (39.7)	−1.0 (30.2)	8.8 (47.8)
Mean daily minimum °C (°F)	−5.0 (23.0)	−3.9 (25.0)	−0.7 (30.7)	4.2 (39.6)	8.5 (47.3)	11.9 (53.4)	13.3 (55.9)	13.1 (55.6)	9.0 (48.2)	4.9 (40.8)	1.0 (33.8)	−3.7 (25.3)	4.4 (39.9)
Record low °C (°F)	−19.0 (−2.2)	−21.7 (−7.1)	−16.3 (2.7)	−7.3 (18.9)	−3.7 (25.3)	4.0 (39.2)	4.8 (40.6)	3.4 (38.1)	−0.3 (31.5)	−9.5 (14.9)	−13.9 (7.0)	−23.3 (−9.9)	−23.3 (−9.9)
Average precipitation mm (inches)	39.8 (1.57)	41.8 (1.65)	49.0 (1.93)	50.4 (1.98)	92.3 (3.63)	99.8 (3.93)	100.9 (3.97)	76.5 (3.01)	66.9 (2.63)	61.4 (2.42)	48.5 (1.91)	51.5 (2.03)	778.8 (30.66)
Average precipitation days (≥ 1.0 mm)	8.4	9.0	8.6	8.9	12.0	11.5	11.8	8.3	8.6	7.9	8.7	9.0	112.7
Mean monthly sunshine hours	73.1	90.8	148.1	192.6	239.5	259.3	272.1	275.7	190.3	151.9	94.8	58.2	2,046.4
Source 1: NOAA
Source 2: Meteomanz (extremes since 2021)
