= Brebeni =

- Commune
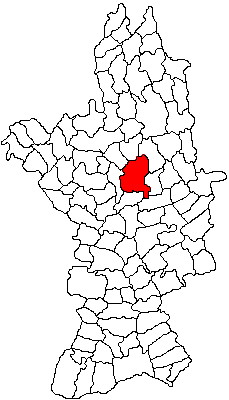
- Location in Olt County

- Location in Romania
- Coordinates: 44°22′N 24°27′E
- Country: Romania
- County: Olt
- Population (2021-12-01): 2,476
- Time zone: EET/EEST (UTC+2/+3)
- Vehicle reg.: OT

Brebeni is a commune in Olt County, Muntenia, Romania. It is composed of two villages, Brebeni and Teiușu.
