= List of tallest church buildings =

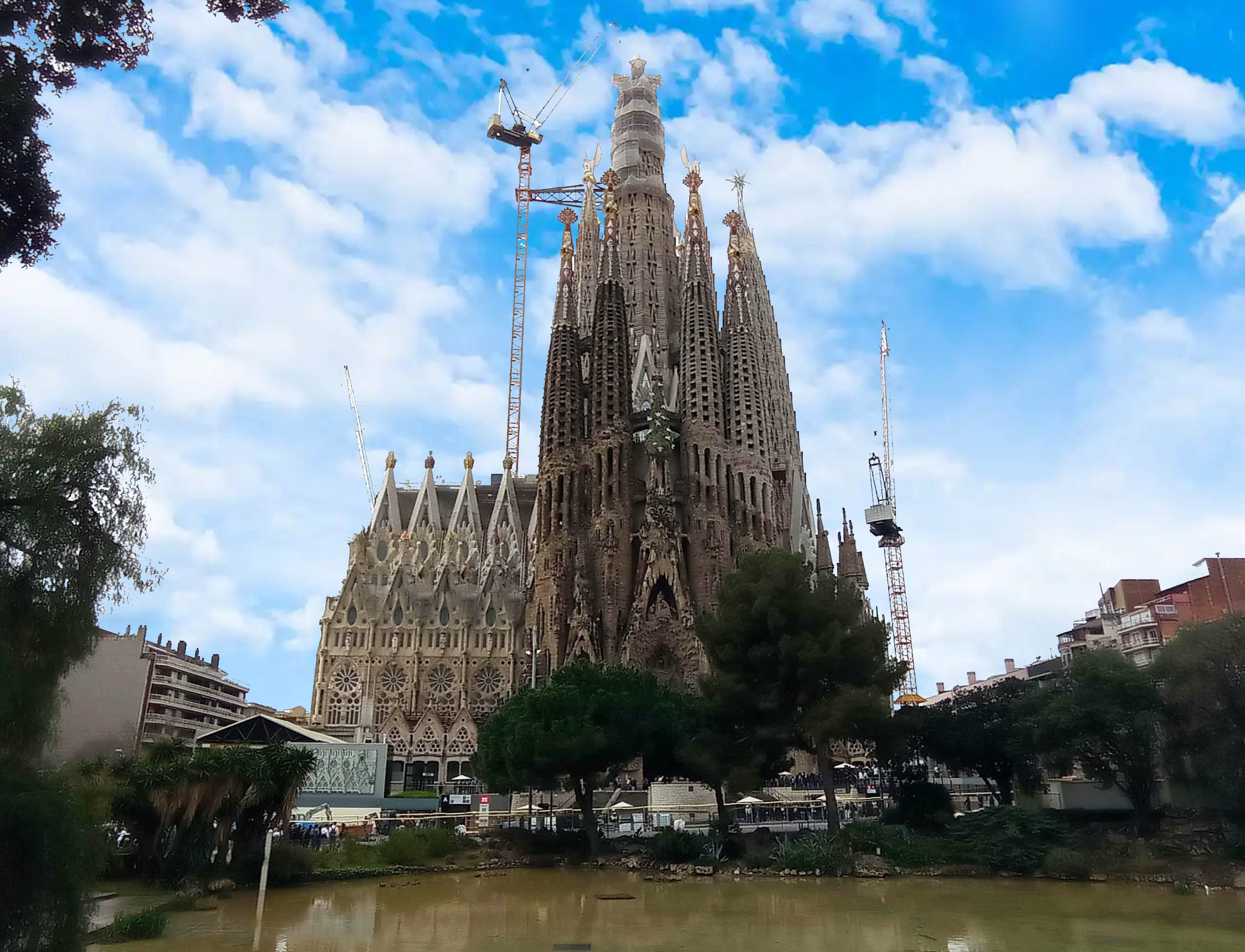
Basílica i Temple Expiatori de la Sagrada Família, the tallest church building in the world. This photo was taken on 8 March 2026, sixteen days after it reached its final height.

This list of tallest church buildings ranks church buildings by height. From the Middle Ages until the advent of the skyscraper, Christian church buildings were often the world's tallest buildings. From 1221, when the spire of Old St. Paul's Cathedral surpassed the height of the Great Pyramid of Giza, until the Washington Monument was completed in 1884, a succession of church buildings held this title.

- The tallest church building in the world is the Sagrada Família in Barcelona, which surpassed Ulm Minster (161.53 m) on 30 October 2025 when its central tower reached 162.91 m. The central tower reached the final height of 172.5 m on 20 February 2026.
- The tallest completed church building in the world was formerly the Ulm Minster (161.53 m), the main Lutheran congregation in Ulm, Germany.
- The tallest domed church building, and the tallest Catholic church until surpassed by Sagrada Família, is the Basilica of Our Lady of Peace (158 m) in Yamoussoukro, Ivory Coast.
- The tallest cathedral as well as the tallest church building with two steeples is Cologne Cathedral (157.22 m) in Cologne, Germany.
- The tallest domed cathedral as well as the tallest Eastern Orthodox is People's Salvation Cathedral (132 m) in Bucharest, Romania.
- The tallest brickwork church building is St Martin's Church (130.6 m) in Landshut, Germany.
- The tallest brickwork church building with two steeples is St Mary's Church (125 m) in Lübeck, Germany.
- The tallest wooden church building is Săpânța-Peri Monastery church (78 m) in Săpânța, Romania.
- The tallest church building in the Americas is the Cathedral of Maringá (124 m) in Maringá, Brazil.

The cities with the most churches surpassing 100 metres (330 feet) are Hamburg (5 of the 28 (Note: including Basílica i Temple Expiatori de la Sagrada Família (still under construction) and free-standing church towers) tallest churches, with 5 towers overall) and Lübeck (4 of the 55 (Note: including Basílica i Temple Expiatori de la Sagrada Família (still under construction) and free-standing church towers) tallest churches, two of which with twin towers → 6 towers overall), followed by Tallinn (2), St. Petersburg (2), New York City (2), Dortmund (2) and Stralsund (2).

The cities with the most churches surpassing 75 metres (246 feet) are Berlin (16), Hamburg (9), Paris (8), Dresden (8), Vienna (7), Stockholm (7) and Munich (7), while in the Americas it is New York City (4).

== Overview ==
=== Timeline - the tallest church buildings of their time ===
Tallest in years	Name	Image	Historical height	Increase	Time span	Current height	City	Notes
1180–1240	Malmesbury Abbey		131.0 m (431.0 ft)		60 years	15.0 m (49.2 ft)	Malmesbury	The spire and the tower it was built upon collapsed in a storm around 1500.
1240–1311	Old St Paul's Cathedral		149.0 m (489.0 ft)	13.7%	71 years	111.3 m (365.0 ft) (new St Paul's Cathedral)	London	The cathedral stood on the site of the present St Paul's Cathedral until 1666. Its spire existed until 1561.
1311–1549	Lincoln Cathedral		160.0 m (524.9 ft)	7.4%	238 years	83.0 m (272.3 ft)	Lincoln	Tallest ever building until 1890, only then was its original height surpassed by Ulm Minster; central spire collapsed in 1549
1549–1569	St. Mary's Church		151.0 m (495.4 ft)	−5.4%	20 years (94 years)	104.0 m (341.2 ft)	Stralsund	First mentioned in 1298; collapse of first tower in 1382; second, 151 metres (495 feet) tall spire finished in 1485
1569–1573	Beauvais Cathedral		153.0 m (502.0 ft)	1.3%	4 years	47.5 m (155.8 ft)	Beauvais	Tower collapsed in 1573
1573–1647	St. Mary's Church		151.0 m (495.4 ft)	−1.3%	74 years (94 years)	104.0 m (341.2 ft)	Stralsund	Second spire burned down after a lightning strike in 1647; current, third spire finished in 1708
1647–1874	Strasbourg Cathedral		142.0 m (465.9 ft)	−6%	227 years	142.0 m (465.9 ft)	Strasbourg	Finished in 1439; tallest structure built and finished in the Middle Ages; earliest church to have been the world's tallest which still stands at its original height
1874–1876	St. Nicholas Church		147.3 m (483.3 ft)	3.5%	2 years	147.3 m (483.3 ft)	Hamburg	Bombed in 1943; demolition of most of the church in 1951; tower remains and serves as a war memorial
1876–1880	Rouen Cathedral		151.0 m (495.4 ft)	2.7%	4 years	151.0 m (495.4 ft)	Rouen	Church finished in 1506; its cast iron spire was built between 1825 and 1876; painted by Claude Monet
1880–1890	Cologne Cathedral		157.4 m (516.4 ft)	4.2%	10 years	157.4 m (516.4 ft)	Cologne	Only church with two main towers to ever have been the world's tallest
1890–2025	Ulm Minster		161.5 m (529.9 ft)	2.6%	135 years	161.5 m (529.9 ft)	Ulm	First time since 1311 that a church surpassed the original height of Lincoln Cathedral; intentionally built a few metres taller than Cologne Cathedral
since 2025	Sagrada Família		172.5 m (565.9 ft)	6.9%		172.5 m (565.9 ft)	Barcelona	Construction began in 1882. Tallest church of all time.

=== Country and city list – churches (Note: including free standing church towers) ≥ 95 m (312 ft) ===
Rank	Country	Churches ≥ 95 m ≥ 312 ft	Tallest	Rank	City	Churches ≥ 95 m ≥ 312 ft	Tallest
1	Germany	38	161.5	1	Hamburg – Germany	5	147.3
2	France	13	151.0	2	Lübeck – Germany	4	125.0
3	Poland	11	141.5	3	Vienna – Austria	3	136.4
4	Italy + Vatican City	10 (Note: 9 in Italy, 1 in Vatican City)	136.6	4	Tallinn – Estonia	2	123.7
5	Russia	8	122.5	5	St. Petersburg – Russia	2	122.5
6	Belgium	7 (Note: 6 in Flanders (1 of which in Brussels), 1 in Wallonia)	124.9	6	New York City – United States	2	119.8
7	Netherlands	6	112.3	7	Stockholm – Sweden	2	116.0
8	Austria	5	136.4	8	Dortmund – Germany	2	105.0
9	Sweden	5	118.7	9	Melbourne – Australia	2	105.0
10	United Kingdom	4 (Note: all 4 in England)	123.1	10	Stralsund – Germany	2	104.0
11	United States	3	119.8	11	Munich – Germany	2	98.6
12	Czech Republic	3 (Note: 2 in Bohemia, 1 in Moravia)	102.3	12	Barcelona – Spain	1 (Note: final height of the Basílica i Temple Expiatori de la Sagrada Família (still under construction))	172.5
13	Switzerland	3	100.6	13	Ulm – Germany	1	161.5
14	Spain	2 (Note: including Basílica i Temple Expiatori de la Sagrada Família (still under construction))	172.5	14	Yamoussoukro – Ivory Coast	1	158.0
15	Brazil	2	124.0	15	Cologne – Germany	1	157.4
16	Estonia	2	123.7	16	Rouen – France	1	151.0
17	Colombia	2	113.0	17	Strasbourg – France	1	142.0
18	Argentina	2	112.0	18	Licheń Stary – Poland	1	141.5
19	Australia	2	105.0	19	Vatican City (Rome) – Vatican City	1	136.6
20	Hungary	2	100.0	20	Bucharest – Romania	1	135.0
21	Ivory Coast	1	158.0	21	Linz – Austria	1	134.8
22	Romania	1	135.0	22	Landshut – Germany	1	130.6
23	Latvia	1	123.3	23	Novara – Italy	1	126.0
24	Ecuador	1	115.0	24	Maringá – Brazil	1	124.0
25	Croatia	1	108.4	25	Antwerp – Belgium	1	123.9
26	Mexico	1	107.5	26	Riga – Latvia	1	123.3
27	Bosnia and Herzegovina	1	107.2	27	Salisbury – United Kingdom	1	123.1
28	Canada	1 (Note: in Quebec)	102.0	28	Uppsala – Sweden	1	118.7
29	Norway	1	97.8	29	Schwerin – Germany	1	117.5
30	Finland	1	96.6	30	Rostock – Germany	1	117.0
31	Ukraine	1	96.5	31	Freiburg – Germany	1	116.0
32	Denmark	1	96.0	32	Bruges – Belgium	1	115.6
Sum	Earth	143 (Note: 1 of which is still under construction)	172.5	33	Quito – Ecuador	1	115.0

== Constructed ==
=== Church buildings ≥ 100 m (328 ft) ===
This list does not include church buildings that incorporate a significant portion of space to non-church uses, such as the Chicago Temple Building. It does not include structures from non-Christian religions.

Rank	Name of Church	Image	Height metres (feet)	Completed	Location	Country	Christian denomination	Coordinates	Notes
1	Basilica of the Sagrada Familia		172.5 m (566 ft)	2026	Barcelona	Spain	Catholic	41°24′13″N 2°10′28″E	World's tallest church; tallest Catholic church; the architect did not want the basilica to exceed the height of Montjuïc
2	Ulm Minster		161.5 m (530 ft)	1890	Ulm	Germany	Lutheran	48.398497°N 9.991797°E	Tallest Lutheran church; spire's height originally intended to be shorter but increased in order to surpass Cologne Cathedral
3	Basilica of Our Lady of Peace		158.0 m (518 ft)	1989	Yamoussoukro	Ivory Coast	Catholic	6.811126°N 5.296918°W	World's tallest domed church
4	Cologne Cathedral		157.2 m (516 ft)	1880	Cologne	Germany	Catholic	50.941147°N 6.957283°E	Tallest building in the world 1880–1884; tallest twin tower façade; tallest cathedral in the world; place of the Shrine of the Three Kings
5	Rouen Cathedral		151.0 m (495 ft)	1876	Rouen	France	Catholic	49.440202°N 1.095087°E	Tallest building in the world 1876–1880; tallest church in France
6	Strasbourg Cathedral		142.0 m (466 ft)	1439	Strasbourg	France	Catholic	48.581808°N 7.750361°E	Tallest building in the world 1647–1874; tallest 15th-century structure in the world
7	St. Peter's Basilica		136.6 m(448 ft)	1626	Vatican City	Vatican City	Catholic	41.902159°N 12.453566°E	The largest church building in the world both by internal area and volume
8	St. Stephen's Cathedral "Steffl"		136.4 m (448 ft)	1433	Vienna	Austria	Catholic	48.208255°N 16.373030°E	Tallest church in Austria; tallest in the area of the former Austria-Hungary; home of the "Madonna of Pötsch" (Madonna von Pötsch); colloquially called "Steffl"
9	New Linz Cathedral		134.8 m (442 ft)	1924	Linz	Austria	Catholic	48.300776°N 14.285868°E	Largest church in Austria by area, but two metres shorter than St. Stephen's Cathedral, Vienna since no building in Austria-Hungary was allowed to be higher than St. Stephen's Cathedral (also the reason why there are no taller churches in Budapest and Prague)
10	St. Michael's Church		132.0 m (433 ft)	1786	Hamburg	Germany	Lutheran	53.548397°N 9.978432°E	Tallest 18th-century church in the world; Hamburg's most famous church; colloquially called "Michel"
11	St. Peter's Church		132.0 m (433 ft)	1878	Hamburg	Germany	Lutheran	53.550367°N 9.996365°E	Hamburg's tallest completely preserved church
12	St. Martin's Church		130.6 m (428 ft)	1500	Landshut	Germany	Catholic	48.534192°N 12.150680°E	Tallest brickwork structure in the world; tallest church in Bavaria
13	People's Salvation Cathedral		127.0 m (433 ft)	2025	Bucharest	Romania	Eastern Orthodox	44°25′33.26″N 26°4′56.37″E	World's tallest domed cathedral; tallest Orthodox church building; home of the largest free-swinging church bell in the world
14	Basilica of San Gaudenzio		126.0 m (413 ft)	1887	Novara	Italy	Catholic	45.448746°N 8.619520°E	Tallest church in Italy; 121.0 metres tall without the statue on its top
15	St. James' Church		125.4 m (411 ft)	1963	Hamburg	Germany	Lutheran	53.550359°N 10.000359°E	Fourth-tallest church in Hamburg; new, modern spire finished 1963
16	St. Mary's Church		125.0 m (410 ft)	1350	Lübeck	Germany	Lutheran	53.867768°N 10.684427°E	Second-tallest twin tower façade; tallest twin tower façade finished in the Middle Ages (overtaken by Cologne cathedral only in 1880)
17	Maringá Cathedral		124.0 m (407 ft)	1972	Maringá	Brazil	Catholic	23.426271°S 51.938258°W	Tallest church in the Americas; tallest in South America
18	Cathedral of Our Lady		123.9 m (406 ft)	1521	Antwerp	Belgium	Catholic	51.220503°N 4.400593°E	Tallest church in the Low Countries; tallest in Belgium; tallest in Flanders
19	St. Olaf's Church "Oleviste"		123.7 m (406 ft)	1450	Tallinn	Estonia	Lutheran	59.441378°N 24.747334°E	Tallest church in the Baltic states; tallest in Estonia; tallest Baptist church; according to some sources also the tallest building in the world from 1549 to 1625 (Note: this claim is controversial: although one account of a 16th-century rebuilding mentions that the church had been "ten fathoms" higher before, all known images from that time depict a spire similar in proportions to the current one)
20	St. Peter's Church		123.3 m (405 ft)	1690/1973	Riga	Latvia	Lutheran	56.947499°N 24.108700°E	Second-tallest church in the Baltic states; tallest in Latvia; tower collapsed in 1666 and again in 1721; tower and roof damaged in World War II, restored in 1973
21	Salisbury Cathedral		123.1 m (404 ft)	1315	Salisbury	United Kingdom	Anglican	51.065008°N 1.797300°W	Tallest church in the United Kingdom; tallest in England; largest cathedral close in Britain (80 acres (32 hectares))
22	Peter and Paul Cathedral		122.5 m (402 ft)	1733	St. Petersburg	Russia	Eastern Orthodox	59.950128°N 30.316035°E	Second-tallest Orthodox church; tallest Orthodox belltower; tallest church in Russia; tallest in St. Petersburg
23	Riverside Church		119.8 m (393 ft)	1930	New York City	United States	Baptist / United Church of Christ	40.811987°N 73.963135°W	Tallest church in North America; tallest in the United States; second-tallest in the Americas
24	Uppsala Cathedral		118.7 m (389 ft)	1435	Uppsala	Sweden	Lutheran	59.858036°N 17.632723°E	Third-tallest twin tower façade; tallest church in Scandinavia; tallest in Sweden; largest cathedral in Scandinavia (length 118.95 m)
25	Schwerin Cathedral		117.5 m (385 ft)	1892	Schwerin	Germany	Lutheran	53.629626°N 11.413898°E	Tallest church in Mecklenburg-Vorpommern; tallest in Mecklenburg
26	St. Peter's Church		117.0 m (384 ft)	1577	Rostock	Germany	Lutheran	54.090655°N 12.147561°E	
27	St. Catherine's Church		116.7 m (383 ft)	1657	Hamburg	Germany	Lutheran	53.546000°N 9.994023°E	Fifth-tallest church in Hamburg
28–29 (28)	Freiburg Minster		116.0 m (381 ft)	1330	Freiburg	Germany	Catholic	47.995536°N 7.852221°E	Tallest church in Baden
28–29 (29)	Klara Church		116.0 m (381 ft)	1888	Stockholm	Sweden	Lutheran	59.331247°N 18.061234°E	Tallest church in Stockholm; second-tallest in Scandinavia and Sweden
30	Church of Our Lady		115.6 m (379 ft)	1465	Bruges	Belgium	Catholic	51.204816°N 3.224361°E	Second-tallest church in the Low Countries; second tallest brickwork tower in the world.
31	Basílica del Voto Nacional		115.0 m (377 ft)	1988	Quito	Ecuador	Catholic	0.215025°S 78.507711°W	Fourth-tallest twin tower façade
32-34 (32)	Lübeck Cathedral		114.7 m (376 ft)	1341	Lübeck	Germany	Lutheran	53.860756°N 10.684901°E	Fifth-tallest twin tower façade; earliest of the brickwork churches on the Baltic Sea
32–34 (33)	Florence Cathedral		114.5 m (376 ft)	1434	Florence	Italy	Catholic	43.773017°N 11.257033°E	Second-tallest church in Italy; tallest in Tuscany
32–34 (34)	St. Andrew's Church		114.5 m (376 ft)	1890	Hildesheim	Germany	Lutheran	52.151628°N 9.949469°E	Tallest church in Lower Saxony
35	Orléans Cathedral		114.0 m (374 ft)	1345	Orléans	France	Catholic	47.901889°N 1.910492°E	
36–37 (36)	Chartres Cathedral		113.0 m (371 ft)	1514	Chartres	France	Catholic	48.447479°N 1.487103°E	
36–37 (37)	Cathedral Basilica of Our Lady of Rosary		113.0 m (371 ft)	1939	Manizales	Colombia	Catholic	5.067404°N 75.517270°W	Tallest church in Colombia
38	Amiens Cathedral		112.7 m (370 ft)	1549	Amiens	France	Catholic	49.894584°N 2.302204°E	
39–40 (39)	St James' Church		112.0 m (367 ft)	1334	Lübeck	Germany	Lutheran	53.870946°N 10.688602°E	Third-tallest church in Lübeck
39–40 (40)	La Plata Cathedral		112.0 m (367 ft)	2000	La Plata	Argentina	Catholic	34.922679°S 57.955611°W	Tallest church building in Argentina. Designated cathedral in 1932, towers finished in 2000.
41	St. Paul's Cathedral		111.3 m (365 ft)	1710	London	United Kingdom	Anglican	51.513931°N 0.098306°W	Tallest church in London; second-tallest in the United Kingdom and England; tallest building in London until 1962
42	Schleswig Cathedral		111.2 m (365 ft)	1894	Schleswig	Germany	Lutheran	54.513471°N 9.568652°E	Tallest church in the former Duchy of Schleswig
43	Cathedral Basilica of St James the Apostle		110.18 m (361 ft)	1892	Szczecin	Poland	Catholic	53.424662°N 14.555576°E	Tallest church in Pomerania; 1892–1944 it measured 119.8 m; until 2008 it was 67 m
44	Sacred Heart Church		109.6 m (360 ft)	1891	Graz	Austria	Catholic	47.069431°N 15.455642°E	Third-tallest church in Austria; tallest in Styria
45-46 (45)	Nieuwe Kerk		108.8 m (357 ft)	1496	Delft	Netherlands	Dutch Reformed	52.012135°N 4.360215°E	Fourth-tallest church in the Low Countries
45-46 (46)	St. John's Church		108.7 m (357 ft)	1408	Lüneburg	Germany	Lutheran	53.247758°N 10.412392°E	Second-tallest church in Lower Saxony; once slightly taller; spire rebuilt from 1406 to 1408
47-48 (47)	Milan Cathedral		108.5 m (355 ft)	1886	Milan	Italy	Catholic	45.464251°N 9.192070°E	Fifth-tallest church in Italy; tallest in Lombardy
47-48 (48)	Zagreb Cathedral		108.4 m (355 ft)	1880	Zagreb	Croatia	Catholic	45.814443°N 15.979412°E	Tallest gothic church southeast of the Alps, tallest in Croatia, and former Yugoslavia
49	St Peter's Church		108.2 m (354 ft)	1450	Lübeck	Germany	Lutheran	53.865951°N 10.682964°E	Fourth-tallest church in Lübeck
50	Diocesan Sanctuary of Our Lady of Guadalupe		107.5 m (352.7 ft)	2008	Zamora de Hidalgo	Mexico	Catholic	19.983619°N 102.281462°W	The tallest church building in Mexico.
51	Linköping Cathedral		107.0 m (351 ft)	1886	Linköping	Sweden	Lutheran	58.411093°N 15.616765°E	
52–54 (52)	Jasna Góra Monastery		106.0 m (347.8 ft)	1900	Częstochowa	Poland	Catholic	50.812458°N 19.097061°E	Home of the Black Madonna of Częstochowa (Obraz Matki Boskiej Częstochowskiej)
52–54 (53)	Basilica of Our Lady of Luján		106.0 m (347.8 ft)	1935	Luján	Argentina	Catholic	34.564204°S 59.121125°W	Home of the Virgin of Luján
52–54 (54)	St. Joseph's Church		106.0 m (347.8 ft)	1957	Le Havre	France	Catholic	49.491011°N 0.101095°E	
55–59 (55)	St. Peter's Church		105.0 m (344.5 ft)	1310	Malmö	Sweden	Lutheran	55.606902°N 13.002813°E	Fourth-tallest church in Scandinavia and Sweden
55–59 (56)	St. Peter's Church		105.0 m (344.5 ft)	1322	Dortmund	Germany	Lutheran	51.514637°N 7.459980°E	Tallest church in Westphalia; place of the "Golden Wonder of Westphalia" (Goldenes Wunder von Westfalen)
55–59 (57)	St. Nicholas' Church		105.0 m (344.5 ft)	1696	Tallinn	Estonia	Lutheran	59.435955°N 24.742222°E	Third-tallest church in the Baltic states; cathedral itself dates from 1275
55–59 (58)	Regensburg Cathedral		105.0 m (344.5 ft)	1856	Regensburg	Germany	Catholic	49.019389°N 12.097840°E	Second-tallest church in Bavaria; tallest twin tower façade in Bavaria
55–59 (59)	St. Patrick's Cathedral		105.0 m (344.5 ft)	1939	Melbourne	Australia	Catholic	37.810122°S 144.976506°E	Tallest church in Australia
60	St. Catherine's Church		104.7 m (343.5 ft)	1550	Hoogstraten	Belgium	Catholic	51.400871°N 4.761388°E	
61–62 (61)	Seville Cathedral		104.5 m (343 ft)	1568	Seville	Spain	Catholic	37.386203°N 5.992624°W	Height of the Giralda (originally a minaret); second-tallest church in Spain; tallest in Andalusia; largest Gothic cathedral in the world; originally built as a mosque
61–62 (62)	Łódź Cathedral		104.5 m (342.8 ft)	1912	Łódź	Poland	Catholic	51.748985°N 19.460228°E	
63–64 (63)	St. Mary's Church		104.0 m (341.2 ft)	1478	Stralsund	Germany	Lutheran	54.309972°N 13.087383°E	Tallest building in the world 1549–1569 and 1573–1647; third-tallest church in Mecklenburg-Vorpommern; second-tallest in Pomerania
63–64 (64)	St. Reinold's Church		104.0 m (341.2 ft)	1954	Dortmund	Germany	Lutheran	51.514745°N 7.467157°E	Second-tallest church in Westphalia and Dortmund; was 119 metres (390 ft) from 1520 until 1661
65	Cathedral of Christ the Saviour		103.4 m (339.2 ft)	2000	Moscow	Russia	Eastern Orthodox	55.744692°N 37.605380°E	Tallest church in Moscow; fourth-tallest in Russia; reconstruction of the original cathedral consecrated 1883 and demolished by Soviets in 1931
66–68 (66)	St. Catherine's Church		103.0 m (337.9 ft)	1430	Osnabrück	Germany	Lutheran	52.273195°N 8.042443°E	Third-tallest church in Lower Saxony and Westphalia
66–68 (67)	Świdnica Cathedral		103.0 m (337.9 ft)	1496	Świdnica	Poland	Catholic	50.840992°N 16.491600°E	Tallest church in Silesia
66–68 (68)	Hôtel des Invalides		103.0 m (337.9 ft)	1706	Paris	France	Catholic	48.854992°N 2.312405°E	
69–70 (69)	St. Nicholas' Church		102.6 m (336.6 ft)	1667 / c 1430	Stralsund	Germany	Lutheran	54.315284°N 13.090803°E	Fourth-tallest church in Mecklenburg-Vorpommern; third-tallest in Pomerania
69–70 (70)	St. Mary's Church		102.6 m (336.6 ft)	1854	Chojna	Poland	Catholic	52.962654°N 14.429458°E	
71	St. Anthony's Basilica		102.5 m (336.3 ft)	1905	Rheine	Germany	Catholic	52.281810°N 7.449119°E	Fourth-tallest church in Westphalia
72–73 (72)	St. Bartholomew's Cathedral		102.3 m (335.6 ft)	1600	Plzeň	Czech Republic	Catholic	49.747655°N 13.377285°E	Tallest church in the Czech Republic; tallest in Bohemia
72–73 (73)	St. Martin's Cathedral		102.3 m (335.6 ft)	1930	Ypres	Belgium	Catholic	50.851754°N 2.884402°E	Full reconstruction of the medieval church destroyed during World War I. This is a proto-cathedral
74	Saint Joseph's Oratory of Mount Royal		102.0 m (334.6 ft)	1967	Montreal	Canada	Catholic	45.491899°N 73.616343°W	Tallest church in Canada; second-tallest in North America; ninth-tallest in the Americas
75	Saint Isaac's Cathedral		101.5 m (333.0 ft)	1858	St. Petersburg	Russia	Eastern Orthodox	59.934127°N 30.306087°E	Fifth-tallest church in Russia; second-tallest in St. Petersburg
76–79 (76)	Magdeburg Cathedral		101.0 m (331.4 ft)	1520	Magdeburg	Germany	Lutheran	52.124587°N 11.634009°E	Tallest church in Saxony-Anhalt; north tower 100.98 m, south tower 99.25 m
76–79 (77)	Basilica of Our Lady of the Immaculate Conception		101.0 m (331.4 ft)	1866	Boulogne-sur-Mer	France	Catholic	50.726420°N 1.615250°E	
76–79 (78)	Church of the Assumption of the Blessed Virgin Mary		101.0 m (331.4 ft)	1876	Bielawa	Poland	Catholic	50.687071°N 16.616722°E	Second-tallest church in Silesia
76–79 (79)	Liverpool Cathedral		101.0 m (331.4 ft)	1978	Liverpool	United Kingdom	Anglican	53.397510°N 2.973151°W	Third-tallest church in the United Kingdom and England
80	Saint Wenceslas Cathedral		100.7 m (330.4 ft)	1892	Olomouc	Czech Republic	Catholic	49.597567°N 17.262657°E	Second-tallest church in the Czech Republic; tallest in Moravia
81	Bern Minster		100.6 m (330.1 ft)	1893	Bern	Switzerland	Swiss Reformed	46.947321°N 7.451197°E	Tallest church in Switzerland
82	St. Patrick's Cathedral		100.4 m (329.4 ft)	1888	New York City	United States	Catholic	40.758680°N 73.976770°W	Second-tallest church in the US and New York City; third-tallest in North America; tenth-tallest in the Americas; spires completed in 1888, the tallest in New York City from 1880 to 1890.
83–86 (83)	Esztergom Basilica		100.0 m (328.1 ft)	1869	Esztergom	Hungary	Catholic	47.798984°N 18.736238°E	The tallest church building in Hungary and the second tallest of all buildings in Hungary.
83–86 (84)	St. Ludger Church		100.0 m (328.1 ft)	1898	Billerbeck	Germany	Catholic		Fifth-tallest church in Westphalia; tallest twin tower façade in Westphalia
83–86 (85)	Speyer Memorial Church		100.0 m (328.1 ft)	1904	Speyer	Germany	Lutheran	49.315101°N 8.429673°E	Tallest church in Rhineland-Palatinate; tallest in the Palatinate
83–86 (86)	Basilica of the National Shrine of the Immaculate Conception		100.0 m (328.1 ft)	1959	Washington, D.C.	United States	Catholic	38.932807°N 77.000886°W	Third-tallest church in the USA; largest Catholic church in North America

=== Church buildings ≥ 95 m (312 ft) < 100 m (328 ft) ===
Rank	Name of Church	Image	Height metres (feet)	Completed	Location	Country	Christian denomination	Coordinates	Notes
87	St Nicholas' Church		99.9 m (327.8 ft)	1653	Greifswald	Germany	Lutheran	54.095417°N 13.377542°E	Fifth-tallest church in Mecklenburg-Vorpommern; fourth-tallest in Pomerania
88–91 (88)	Votive Church		99.0 m (324.8 ft)	1879	Vienna	Austria	Catholic	48.215278°N 16.358611°E	Fourth-tallest church in Austria; second-tallest in Vienna; tallest twin tower façade in Austria
88–91 (89)	St. Nicomedes' Church		99.0 m (324.8 ft)	1889	Steinfurt	Germany	Catholic		Sixth-tallest church in Westphalia
88–91 (90)	St. John's Church		99.0 m (324.8 ft)	1892	Stargard	Poland	Catholic		Fifth-tallest church in Pomerania
88–91 (91)	Church of Our Lady of Laeken		99.0 m (324.8 ft)	1911	Brussels	Belgium	Catholic		Tallest church in Brussels; seventh-tallest in the Low Countries; fifth-tallest in Belgium and Flanders
92	Munich Frauenkirche		98.6 m (323 ft)	1525	Munich	Germany	Catholic		
93-96 (93)	Wrocław Cathedral		98.0 m (321.5 ft)	1341	Wrocław	Poland	Catholic		
93-96 (94)	Marktkirche		98.0 m (321.5 ft)	1862	Wiesbaden	Germany	Protestant		
93-96 (95)	Sint-Vituskerk		98.0 m (321.5 ft)	1890	Hilversum	Netherlands	Catholic		
93-96 (96)	Berlin Cathedral (Berliner Dom)		98.0 m (321.5 ft)	1905	Berlin-Mitte	Germany	Protestant		Reconstructed after World War II; formerly considerably taller
97	Nidaros Cathedral		97.8 m (320.87 ft)	1300	Trondheim	Norway	Church of Norway		Northernmost medieval cathedral in the world, and the second largest in the Nordic countries
98	St. Martin's Church		97.6 m (320.21 ft)	1883	Malters	Switzerland	Catholic		
99-100 (99)	St. Rumbold's Cathedral		97.3 m (319.23 ft)	1520	Mechelen	Belgium	Catholic		The tower was supposed to be 167 metres (548 ft) tall, but the money ran out.
99-100 (100)	Marktkirche		97.3 m (319 ft)	1952	Hanover	Germany	Lutheran		Rebuilt after World War II in 1952
101-108 (101)	Grote Kerk		97.0 m (318 ft)	1547	Breda	Netherlands	Protestant		
101-108 (102)	Predigerkirche		97.0 m (318 ft)	18th century	Zürich	Switzerland	Swiss Reformed		
101-108 (103)	Temple Saint-Étienne		97.0 m (318 ft)	1866	Mulhouse	France	Calvinist		Tallest Protestant church in France
101-108 (104)	Pavia Cathedral		97.0 m (318 ft)	1885	Pavia	Italy	Catholic		
101-108 (105)	St. Paul's Church, Munich		97.0 m (318 ft)	1906	Munich	Germany	Catholic		
101-108 (106)	St Martin's Church, Arlon		97.0 m (318 ft)	1914	Arlon	Belgium	Catholic	48.682616°N 5.809383°E	
101-108 (107)	Basilica of Sainte-Thérèse		97.0 m (318 ft)	1954	Lisieux	France	Catholic		
101-108 (108)	Annunciation Cathedral		97.0 m (318 ft)	2009	Voronezh	Russia	Eastern Orthodox		
109	Martinikerk		96.9 m (318 ft)	1627	Groningen	Netherlands	Protestant		Spire burned down in 1577, was c. 100 tall
110	Mikael Agricola Church		96.6 m (317 ft)	1935	Helsinki	Finland	Lutheran		
111	St. Vitus Cathedral		96.5 m (317 ft)	1554	Prague	Czech Republic	Catholic		Spire was rebuilt after fire in 1541 (top of the spire rebuilt again in 1770), according some sources pre-fire spire, built in 1402, was 156.5 m tall
112	Clermont-Ferrand Cathedral		96.1 m (315 ft)	1884	Clermont-Ferrand	France	Catholic		
113-120 (113)	Norwich Anglican Cathedral		96.0 m (315 ft)	1480	Norwich	United Kingdom	Anglican		Tallest building in the city of Norwich, UK
113-120 (114)	Aarhus Cathedral		96.0 m (315 ft)	1500	Aarhus	Denmark	Lutheran		Tallest church in Denmark
113-120 (115)	St. Stephen's Basilica		96.0 m (315 ft)	1905	Budapest	Hungary	Catholic		
113-120 (116)	Basilica of St. Anthony		96.0 m (315 ft)	1906	Rybnik	Poland	Catholic		
113-120 (117)	Church of Donaufeld		96.0 m (315 ft)	1914	Vienna	Austria	Catholic		
113-120 (118)	St. Paul's Cathedral		96.0 m (315 ft)	1931	Melbourne	Australia	Anglican		
113-120 (119)	Transfiguration Cathedral		96.0* m (315 ft)	2004	Khabarovsk	Russia	Eastern Orthodox		*The height with the lower church is about 96 m. The actual height from the square is about 83 m.
113-120 (120)	St. Bartholomew's Church		95.8 m (314 ft)	1867	Demmin	Germany	Lutheran		
121	German Church, Stockholm		95.7 m (314 ft)	1884	Stockholm	Sweden	Lutheran		
122	Willibrordi-Dom		95.3 m (313 ft)	1540	Wesel	Germany	Protestant		
123	Kaiserdom		95.1 m (312 ft)	1877	Frankfurt	Germany	Catholic		
124-126 (124)	St. Nicholas Cathedral		95.0 m (312 ft)	1907	Elbląg	Poland	Catholic		
124-126 (125)	Main Cathedral of the Russian Armed Forces		95.0 m (312 ft)	2020	Kubinka	Russia	Eastern Orthodox		
124-126 (126)	Heilig-Kreuz-Kirche		95.0 m (312 ft)	1886	Munich	Germany	Catholic		

== Church structures ≥ 95 m ==
Rank	Name of Church	Image	Height metres (feet)	Completed	Location	Country	Christian denomination	Coordinates	Notes
1	St. Nicholas' Church (Only tower)		147.3 m (483 ft)	1874	Hamburg	Germany	Lutheran	53.547505°N 9.990708°E	Tallest building in the world 1874–1876; only tower remains after 1943 bombing; tower accessible by elevator; a large war memorial
2	Basilica of Our Lady of Licheń (Separate observation tower)		141.5 m (464 ft)	2000	Stary Licheń	Poland	Catholic	52.323239°N 18.356754°E	Connected to the largest church building in Poland and one of the largest in the world.
3	St. Michael's Basilica (Separate bell tower)		114.6 m (374 ft)	1869	Bordeaux	France	Catholic	44.834353°N 0.565962°W	Third-tallest church structure in France
4	Mortegliano Cathedral (Separate bell tower)		113.2 m (371 ft)	1959	Mortegliano	Italy	Catholic	45.943596°N 13.171323°E	Tallest church structure in Friuli-Venezia Giulia
5-6 (5)	Torrazzo of Cremona (Separate bell tower)		112.3 m (368 ft)	1309	Cremona	Italy	Catholic	45.133786°N 10.025086°E	Oldest brick structure taller than 100 m that is still standing (completed in 1309); third tallest brickwork bell tower in the world
5-6 (6)	Dom Tower (Separate bell tower)		112.3 m (368 ft)	1382	Utrecht	Netherlands	None	52.090674°N 5.121308°E	Tallest church structure in the Netherlands; third-tallest in the Low Countries; cathedral's nave collapsed during a storm in 1674.
7	St. Peter and St. Paul's Church (Separate bell tower)		107.2 m (352 ft)	2000	Mostar	Bosnia and Herzegovina	Catholic	43.337902°N 17.808697°E	
8-9 (8)	Resurrection Cathedral (Separate bell tower)		106.0 m (347.8 ft)	1832	Shuya	Russia	Eastern Orthodox	56.856695°N 41.383819°E	
8-9 (9)	Alessandria Cathedral (Separate bell tower)		106.0 m (347.8 ft)	1922	Alessandria	Italy	Catholic	44.912124°N 8.618807°E	
10	St Mark's Campanile (Separate bell tower)		100.1 m (328.4 ft)	1912	Venice	Italy	Catholic	45.434010°N 12.339055°E	
11-12 (11)	Sanctuary of Our Lady of the Holy Rosary of Las Lajas (from the bottom of the canyon; lower + upper church building)		100.0 m (328.1 ft)	1949	Ipiales	Colombia	Catholic	0.48198°N 77.3596°W	Second-tallest church structure in Colombia
11-12 (12)	Cathedral Basilica of the National Shrine of Our Lady Aparecida (Separate clock tower)		100.0 m (328.1 ft)	1980	Aparecida	Brazil	Catholic	22.849757°S 45.234312°W	Steeple at 100.0 m
13	Monastery of Our Lady of Kazan (Separate bell tower)		99.6 m (326.8 ft)	2014	Tambov	Russia	Eastern Orthodox	52.721293°N 41.457896°E	The bell tower is the highest point of the monastery being first consecrated in 1848 and destroyed by the Soviet government in 1936. It has now been fully reconstructed in the years of 2009–2014. 99.6 m in official documents. Unofficially claims 107 m.
14	Onze Lieve Vrouwetoren (Only tower)		98.33 m (322.6 ft)	15th century	Amersfoort	Netherlands	None		Rest of church accidentally blown up in 1797
15	Temple de Garnison (Only tower)		97.0 m (318 ft)	1881	Metz	France	None		Nave was demolished in 1952
16	Great Lavra Bell Tower (Separate bell tower)		96.5 m (317 ft)	1744	Kyiv	Ukraine	Eastern Orthodox		
17	Minor Basilica of San Nicolò, Lecco (Separate bell tower)		96.0 m (315 ft)	1881	Lecco	Italy	Catholic		

=== Church buildings ≥ 75 m (246 ft) < 95 m (325 ft) ===
Note: The church buildings are ordered based on their tallest recorded height in history. Those listed in italics and marked with H (for "historical") are church buildings no longer in existence (suffix D) or no longer as tall as their previous maximum height (suffix >99 if height today > 99 metres, suffix >75 if height today > 75 metres and suffix <75 if height today below 75 metres). These church buildings may appear a second time on the list if their current shorter height is still greater than 75 metres (3,000 inches). In order to view the tallest present churches in a row click the sorting button in the H column.

Height metres (feet)	H	Name	Completed	City	Country	Comment
98.0 m (322 ft)	H D	St. Ansgarii	1243	Bremen	Germany	Destroyed in World War II
96.5 m (317 ft)	H<75	St. Salvator's Church	1904	Duisburg	Germany	Destroyed in World War II, rebuilt with a tower height of 62.5 metres
96.0 m (315 ft)	H<75	St. Pius' Church (St.-Pius-Kirche) (de)	1894	Berlin-Friedrichshain	Germany	Destroyed in World War II, today 66 metres tall
94.6 m (312 ft)		Herz-Jesu-Kirche	1900	Münster	Germany|	
94.1 m (309 ft)		Church of St. Walburge	1866	Preston	United Kingdom	The tallest parish church in the UK
94.0 m (315 ft)		Osijek Co-cathedral	1898	Osijek	Croatia	Tallest structure in Slavonia and second tallest church in Croatia, after Zagreb Cathedral
94.0 m (315 ft)		Church of the Cross (Kreuzkirche)	1788	Dresden-Innere Altstadt	Germany	
94.0 m (309 ft)		Martinikerk	1430	Doesburg	Netherlands	
94.0 m (312 ft)		St. James Church (de)	1486	Villach	Austria	
93.8 m (308 ft)		St. John's Cathedral	1861	Limerick	Ireland	Tallest church spire in Ireland
93.8 m (308 ft)		Paderborn Cathedral	13th century	Paderborn	Germany	
93.72 m (308 ft)		Peter and Paul Church	1767	Porechye	Russia	Tallest rural belltower in Russia
93.4 m (307 ft)		Sint-Vincentiuskerk	1883	Eeklo	Belgium	
93.7 m (307 ft)		Belfry of Transfiguration Cathedral	1804	Rybinsk	Russia	
93.7 m (307 ft)		Smolny Cathedral of the Resurrection	1835	St. Petersburg	Russia	
93.5 m (307 ft)		Church of the Savior on Blood	1907	St. Petersburg	Russia	
93.5 m (307 ft)		St. Ulrich und Afra	1594	Augsburg	Germany	
93.4 m (307 ft)		Cathedral of Saint Paul, National Shrine of the Apostle Paul	1915	St. Paul	United States	
93.0 m (299 ft)		St. Andreas (de)	13th century	Braunschweig	Germany	
93.0 m (305 ft)		New Cathedral of Salamanca	1733	Salamanca	Spain	
93.0 m (305 ft)		Nikolo-Ugresha monastery	1763	Dzerzhinsky	Russia	
93.0 m (305 ft)		Mariahilfkirche	1839	Munich	Germany	
93.0 m (305 ft)		Priory Church of St. Augustine		Gelsenkirchen	Germany	
93.0 m (305 ft)	H<75	St. Matthew's Church (Matthiaskirche)	1895	Berlin-Schöneberg	Germany	Destroyed in World War II, today 60 metres tall tower
93.0 m (305 ft)		Basilica of the Sacred Heart	1970	Koekelberg	Belgium	
93.0 m (305 ft)		Dijon Cathedral	1393	Dijon	France	
93.0 m (305 ft)		Málaga Cathedral	1782	Málaga	Spain	Second tallest church in Andalusia.
92.9 m (305 ft)		St Eusebius' Church	1965	Arnhem	Netherlands	
92.9 m (305 ft)		St. James' Cathedral	1853	Toronto	Canada	
92.7 m (304 ft)		Nicolaikirche	1895	Lüneburg	Germany	Church built from 1407 to 1440, new spire built from 1831 to 1895
92.6 m (303 ft)		Great, or St. James Church	1424	The Hague	Netherlands	
92.6 m (303 ft)		Coral Ridge Presbyterian Church	1973	Fort Lauderdale	United States	
92.5 m (303 ft)		Duomo di Santa Sofia	1824	Lendinara	Italy	
92.5 m (303 ft)		Marienkirche	1892	Kaiserslautern	Germany	
92.3 m (303 ft)		Bremen Cathedral	1893	Bremen	Germany	
92.3 m (303 ft)		Cathedral Church of Saint Mary in Murcia	1792	Murcia	Spain	
92.0 m (302 ft)		Basilica-Cathedral of Our Lady of the Pillar	1715	Zaragoza	Spain	
92.0 m (302 ft)		El Escorial	1584	San Lorenzo de El Escorial	Spain	
92.0 m (302 ft)		Cathedral of Toledo	1440	Toledo	Spain	
92.0 m (302 ft)		Pfarrkirche Mariä Himmelfahrt	1505	Schlanders	Italy	
92.0 m (302 ft)		Church of St. James	1592	Brno	Czech Republic	
92.0 m (302 ft)		São Paulo Cathedral	1954	São Paulo	Brazil	
92.0 m (302 ft)		Västerås Cathedral	1693	Västerås	Sweden	
92.0 m (302 ft)		Église Saint-Pierre	17th century	Steenvoorde	France	
92.0 m (302 ft)		Sacred Heart Church	1907	Turnhout	Belgium	
92.0 m (302 ft)		Saint Bartholomew's Church	1911	Gliwice	Poland	
91.7 m (301 ft)		National Cathedral	1990	Washington, D.C.	United States	
91.7 m (301 ft)		St. Francis de Sales Church	1908	St. Louis	United States	
91.7 m (301 ft)		Pfarrkirche Klagenfurt-St. Egid (de)	1725	Klagenfurt	Austria	
91.7 m (301 ft)		Basilica of Sainte-Anne-de-Beaupré	1923	Sainte-Anne-de-Beaupré	Canada	
91.6 m (300.5 ft)		St. James's Cathedral	1225	Riga	Latvia	
91.5 m (300 ft)		St. Martin's Basilica	1534	Amberg	Germany	
91.5 m (300 ft)		St. Elizabeth's Church		Wrocław	Poland	
91.5 m (300 ft)		Halberstadt Cathedral	1491	Halberstadt	Germany	
91.2 m (299 ft)		Church of St. Magdalene	1820	Alpnach	Switzerland	
91.2 m (299 ft)		Our Lady's Church (Frauenkirche)	1743	Dresden-Innere Altstadt	Germany	Destroyed by bombing in 1945 and rededicated in 2005
91.1 m (299 ft)		St. James Church	1878	The Hague	Netherlands	
91.0 m (299 ft)		Cathedral of Hope	1935	Pittsburgh	United States	
91.0 m (299 ft)		St. Mary's Basilica	1884	Kevelaer	Germany	
91.0 m (299 ft)	H<75	St. Alegundis' Church		Emmerich am Rhein	Germany	Destroyed in World War II, rebuilt with a tower height of 58 metres
91.0 m (299 ft)		St. Joseph	1914	Speyer	Germany	
91.0 m (299 ft)		Neubaukirche	1582	Würzburg	Germany	
91.0 m (299 ft)		Pfarrkirche St. Marien (Friedland)	1500	Friedland (Mecklenburg)	Germany	
91.0 m (299 ft)		New St. John's Church	1874	Munich	Germany	
91.0 m (298 ft)		St. Peter Cathedral	1893	Erie, Pennsylvania	United States	
90.5 m (297 ft)		Lange Jan	1300	Middelburg	Netherlands	The tower was rebuilt after destruction by Luftwaffe bombings in 1940
90.5 m (297 ft)		Canterbury Cathedral	1494	Canterbury	United Kingdom	Cathedral itself dates from 1077
90.5 m (297 ft)		St. Joseph's Church	1897	Koblenz	Germany	
90.3 m (296 ft)		Nikolo-Berlyukovsky Monastery	1899	Avdotyino	Russia	
90.1 m (296 ft)		St. Joseph	1891	Viersen	Germany	
90.1 m (296 ft)		St. Lamberti	1898	Münster	Germany	
90.0 m (295 ft)	H<75	Notre Dame de Paris	1345	Paris	France	Central spire (built in the mid-19th century) destroyed in the April 2019 fire
90.0 m (295 ft)		Coventry Cathedral	1433	Coventry	United Kingdom	The spire was the only part of the cathedral that survived intact when it was bombed in 1940
90.0 m (295 ft)		St Colman's Cathedral	1919	Cobh	Ireland	
90.0 m (295 ft)		Cathedral of Santa Eulalia	15th century	Barcelona	Spain	
90.0 m (295 ft)		Cathedral	1776	Riga	Latvia	
90.0 m (295 ft)		Church at the Southern Star (Kirche am Südstern) (de)	1897	Berlin-Kreuzberg	Germany	
90.0 m (295 ft)		St. Nikolajs	1829	Copenhagen	Denmark	
90.0 m (295 ft)		Helligåndskirken	1409	Copenhagen	Denmark	
90.0 m (295 ft)		St. Mary's Episcopal Cathedral	1917	Edinburgh	United Kingdom	
90.0 m (295 ft)		St. James' Church	1515	Louth	United Kingdom	
90.0 m (295 ft)		St. Martin Garrison Church (Garnisonkirche St. Martin)	1900	Dresden-Albertstadt	Germany	
90.0 m (295 ft)		Georgskirche	1501	Nördlingen	Germany	
90.0 m (295 ft)		Abbaye-aux-Hommes	13th century	Caen	France	Formerly much taller
90.0 m (295 ft)		Saint-Éloi	15th century	Dunkirk	France	
90.0 m (295 ft)		Co-cathedral	1898	Osijek	Croatia	
90.0 m (295 ft)		La Seo Cathedral	1704	Zaragoza	Spain	
90.0 m (295 ft)		St. Walpurga's Church	1624	Oudenaarde	Belgium	
90.0 m (295 ft)		Liège Cathedral	1812	Liège	Belgium	
90.0 m (295 ft)		St. Nicholas Church	1480	Flensburg	Germany	
90.0 m (295 ft)		Santa Maria Assunta	1893	Breganze	Italy	
90.0 m (295 ft)		St. Mary's Maternity Church	1370	Trzebiatów	Poland	
90.0 m (295 ft)		Mariä Himmelfart	1908	Schönau im Schwarzwald	Germany	
90.0 m (295 ft)		Mariazell Basilica	17th century	Mariazell	Austria	
90.0 m (295 ft)	H<75	Sint-Petruskerk		Oirschot	Netherlands	Pinnacle destroyed by a storm in 1558, actual height: 72 metres
90.0 m (295 ft)	H<75	St. Urbanus	1893	Gelsenkirchen	Germany	Tower was destroyed in World War II, actual height: 48 metres
90.0 m (295 ft)	H<75	St. Peter		Altentreptow	Germany	Tower was destroyed in 1773, actual height: 65 metres
89.9 m (294 ft)		Vor Frelsers Kirke	1696	Copenhagen	Denmark	
89.7 m (294 ft)		St. Mary's Church (Marienkirche)	1789	Berlin-Mitte	Germany	
89.5 m (294 ft)		Assumption Cathedral	1841	Kharkiv	Ukraine	
89.4 m (290 ft)		St. Nicholas Church, Harvestehude (de)	1962	Hamburg	Germany	
89.3 m (292 ft)		St. Bavo's Cathedral	1538	Ghent	Belgium	
89.3 m (292 ft)		St Mary Redcliffe	1872	Bristol	United Kingdom	The previous spire collapsed in a storm in the 1440s
88.9 m (291 ft)		Votive Temple of Maipú	1974	Maipu	Chile	
88.7 m (290 ft)		Metropolitan Cathedral of Christ the King	1967	Liverpool	United Kingdom	
88.6 m (290 ft)		St. Peter's Church	1906	Munich	Germany	
88.5 m (290 ft)		St. Peter and St. Paul's Church	1500	Čáslav	Czech Republic	
88.5 m (290 ft)		Church of St. Margaret	1894	Wadersloh	Germany	
88.43 m (295 ft)		Garrison Church	1732	Potsdam	Germany	Damaged in World War II and later destroyed by the GDR regime. Currently being reconstructed since 2018.
88.3 m (289 ft)		Peterskirche	1885	Leipzig	Germany	
88.3 m (288 ft)		Washington Temple	1974	Kensington, Maryland	United States	Tallest LDS temple
88.3 m (288 ft)		St. Martin's Church	14th century	Halberstadt	Germany	
88.0 m (285 ft)		St. Gertrude's Church, Uhlenhorst (de)	1885	Hamburg	Germany	
88.0 m (279 ft)		St. Johannes Baptist	1247	Warburg	Germany	
88.0 m (279 ft)		Trinity Lavra of St. Sergius	1770	Sergiyev Posad	Russia	
88.0 m (279 ft)		Luther Church (Lutherkirche) (de)	1894	Berlin-Schöneberg	Germany	
88.0 m (288 ft)		Segovia Cathedral	1558	Segovia	Spain	Historically the tallest church in Spain at 108 metres. Original spire destroyed by lightning in 1614.
88.0 m (288 ft)		Burgos Cathedral	1400	Burgos	Spain	
88.0 m (288 ft)		Pfarrkirche St. Stephan (de)	1725	Stockerau	Austria	
88.0 m (288 ft)		St George's Church	1911	Eindhoven	Netherlands	
88.0 m (288 ft)		St. Mary's Church	1877	Neubrandenburg	Germany	
88.0 m (288 ft)		Church of St. Anthony	1877	Papenburg	Germany	
88.0 m (288 ft)		Church of Saint Johann and Paul	1822	Schüpfheim	Switzerland	
87.9 m (288 ft)		St. Bernard's Church	1901	Karlsruhe	Germany	
87.7 m (287 ft)		Dreikönigskirche	1857	Dresden-Innere Neustadt	Germany	Completely destroyed in the 1945 bombing and rebuilt 1984–1991
87.6 m (287 ft)		St. Stephen's Church		Tangermünde	Germany	
87.6 m (287 ft)		Stadtpfarrkirche Rottenmann (de)	1513	Rottenmann	Austria	
87.5 m (287 ft)		Saint Anthony Church	1930	Valmadrera	Italy	
87.2 m (286 ft)		St. Mary's Church	1672	Zwickau	Germany	
87.2 m (286 ft)		Fifth Avenue Presbyterian Church	1875	New York City	United States	
87.1 m (285 ft)		Saint-Epvre	1872	Nancy	France	
87.1 m (285 ft)		Holy Trinity Cathedral of Tbilisi	2002	Tbilisi	Georgia	
87.0 m (285 ft)		St. Sebastian's Church (St.-Sebastians-Kirche)		Berlin-Gesundbrunnen	Germany	
87.0 m (285 ft)		Church of Saint Myrrhbearers	1820	Kaluga	Russia	
87.0 m (285 ft)		Holy Cross Church		Münster	Germany	
87.0 m (285 ft)		Trinity Church	1888	Arendal	Norway	
87.0 m (285 ft)		INC Central Temple	1984	Quezon City	Philippines	Tallest church in Metro Manila, run by Iglesia ni Cristo (Church of Christ)
87.0 m (285 ft)		Kostol Nanebovzatia Panny Márie	14th century	Spišská Nová Ves	Slovakia	
87.0 m (285 ft)		Sacred Heart Cathedral	1977	Bendigo	Australia	Tallest provincial Australian church
87.0 m (285 ft)		St Stephen's Church, Braunau (de)	1759	Braunau am Inn	Austria	
87.0 m (285 ft)		Franciscan Church, Salzburg	1498	Salzburg	Austria	
87.0 m (285 ft)		Cathedral of the Assumption	1852	Louisville	United States	
87.0 m (285 ft)		St. Clement's Church	15th century	Steenwijk	Netherlands	the tower of the church hosts since 1907 a water tank with a volume of 145 m^{3}
87.0 m (285 ft)		Reims Cathedral	14th century	Reims	France	
87.0 m (285 ft)		Saint-Nicolas	1545	Saint-Nicolas-de-Port	France	
87.0 m (285 ft)		Rodez Cathedral	1531	Rodez	France	
87.0 m (285 ft)		Notre-Dame de l’Assomption		Marciac	France	
87.0 m (285 ft)		Church of the Transfiguration	1512	Tábor	Czech Republic	
87.0 m (285 ft)		St. James' Church	1881	Aachen	Germany	
87.0 m (285 ft)		Alexander Nevsky Novoyarmarochny Cathedral	1880	Nizhny Novgorod	Russia	
87.0 m (285 ft)		Sacred Heart Church	1952	Gdynia	Poland	
87.0 m (285 ft)		Arcipretal Church	1969	Farra di Soligo	Italy	
86.9 m (285 ft)		Concordia Church	19th century	Mannheim	Germany	
86.9 m (285 ft)		St. Mary's Church	1292	Uelzen	Germany	
86.8 m (284 ft)		Westminster Cathedral	1903	London	United Kingdom	
86.8 m (284 ft)		Church of St. John the Baptist	1894	Krefeld	Germany	
86.8 m (284 ft)		Church of the Redeemer (Heilandskirche) (de)	1894	Berlin-Moabit	Germany	
86.6 m (284 ft)		Riddarholm Church	1300	Stockholm	Sweden	
86.5 m (283 ft)	H<75	Schlosskirche	1897	Chemnitz	Germany	Destroyed in 1945, today 42 metres tall tower
86.3 m (282 ft)		St. Mary's Church	15th century	Rostock	Germany	
86.2 m (282 ft)		St. Wulfram's Church	1450	Grantham	United Kingdom	
86.2 m (282 ft)		Aegidienkirche	1840	Lübeck	Germany	
86.2 m (282 ft)		Marienkirche	1903	Mühlhausen	Germany	Largest parish church in Thuringia
86.2 m (282 ft)		Jakobskirche	16th century	Straubing	Germany	
86.2 m (282 ft)		Saint-Ouen	1851	Rouen	France	
86.1 m (282 ft)		Modena Cathedral	14th century	Modena	Italy	
86.0 m (282 ft)		Mariestad Cathedral	1625	Mariestad	Sweden	
86.0 m (282 ft)		Stora Tuna Kyrka	1469	Borlänge	Sweden	
86.0 m (282 ft)		Lambertikirche	1887	Oldenburg	Germany	
86.0 m (282 ft)		St. Catherine Church	1897	Toruń	Poland	
86.0 m (282 ft)		St. Georg	1904	Ulm	Germany	
86.0 m (282 ft)		St. Nicholas' Church	1896	Zwiesel	Germany	
86.0 m (282 ft)		St. Mary's Church	1859	Kemberg	Germany	
86.0 m (282 ft)		St. Pancras Church	1873	Warstein	Germany	
86.0 m (282 ft)		St. Peter and Paul Church	1902	Katowice	Poland	
86.0 m (282 ft)		St. Medardus Church	15th century	Wervik	Belgium	
86.0 m (282 ft)		Heilandskirche	1888	Leipzig	Germany	
86.0 m (282 ft)		Bürgermeister-Smidt-Gedächtniskirche	1855	Bremerhaven	Germany	
86.0 m (282 ft)		St. James Church	1901	Zürich	Switzerland	
86.0 m (282 ft)	H D	Holy Spirit Church	1728	Potsdam	Germany	Destroyed on April 26, 1945, by fire, demolition of ruin until 1974
85.9 m (281 ft)		Catholic Church of the Royal Court (Katholische Hofkirche)	1755	Dresden-Innere Altstadt	Germany	Elevated to cathedral status in 1980; the largest church in Saxony
85.9 m (281 ft)		Cathedral of St. Joseph	1962	Hartford	United States	
85.9 m (281 ft)		Turku Cathedral	1834	Turku	Finland	
85.9 m (281 ft)		St. Elphin's Church	1860s	Warrington	United Kingdom	Church itself dates from 1354
85.9 m (281 ft)		Trinity Church	1846	New York City	United States	
85.6 m (280 ft)	H<75	Basilica of St Denis	1281	Saint-Denis	France	Now considerably shorter
85.5 m (280 ft)		New Church of St. Margaret	1913	Munich	Germany	
85.5 m (280 ft)		Mainz Cathedral	1769	Mainz	Germany	
85.4 m (280 ft)		St. Mary's Cathedral	1912	Killarney	Ireland	
85.35 m (280 ft)		American Cathedral in Paris	1886	Paris	France	
85.3 m (279 ft)		Westerkerk	1638	Amsterdam	Netherlands	Largest Protestant church in the Netherlands
85.3 m (279 ft)		Johanneskirche	1881	Düsseldorf	Germany	
85.3 m (279 ft)		Saint-Esprit	1931	Paris	France	
85.3 m (279 ft)		St. Mary's Church	1496	Salzwedel	Germany	
85.2 m (279 ft)		Church of St. Paul the Apostle (Apostel-Paulus-Kirche) (de)	1894	Berlin-Schöneberg	Germany	
85.1 m (279 ft)		St. Paul's Church	1484	Eppan an der Weinstraße	Italy	
85.1 m (279 ft)		Meissen Cathedral	1410	Meissen	Germany	
85.0 m (278 ft)		St Mary Abbots	1879	London	United Kingdom	Tallest church spire in London
85.0 m (278 ft)		Lutherkirche	1901	Solingen	Germany	
85.0 m (278 ft)		Municipal lutheran church	1863	Unna	Germany	
85.0 m (278 ft)		Luçon Cathedral	1121	Luçon	France	
85.0 m (278 ft)		Saint-Pierre de Marennes		Marennes	France	
85.0 m (278 ft)		Saint-Nicolas	1850	Nantes	France	
85.0 m (278 ft)		St. Martin's Cathedral	14th century	Bratislava	Slovakia	
85.0 m (278 ft)		Basilica Cathedral of St. Mary of the Assumption	1411	Włocławek	Poland	
85.0 m (278 ft)		Église Saint-Maurice	1893	Strasbourg	France	Estimated height
85.0 m (278 ft)		Our Lady of Sorrows Basilica	1776	Šaštín-Stráže	Slovakia	
85.0 m (278 ft)		Church of Sts. Olha and Elizabeth	1907	Lviv	Ukraine	
85.0 m (278 ft)		St. Peter and St. Paul's Church	1497	Görlitz	Germany	
85.0 m (278 ft)		St. Canisius's Church	1903	Vienna	Austria	
85.0 m (278 ft)		Bordeaux Cathedral	15th century	Bordeaux	France	
85.0 m (278 ft)		St. Florian Monastery Basilica	1750	Sankt Florian	Austria	
85.0 m (278 ft)	H<75	Sankt Johannis		Herford	Germany	Demolished in 1885, replaced by 80 metres tall tower
84.5 m (277 ft)		Pfarrkirche Imst (de)	1493	Imst	Austria	
84.2 m (276 ft)		Church of Our Dear Ladies	1651	Bremen	Germany	
84.2 m (276 ft)		Basilique Notre-Dame-de-Lourdes de Nancy		Nancy	France	
84.0 m (276 ft)		Högalidskyrkan	1923	Stockholm	Sweden	
84.0 m (276 ft)		Đakovo Cathedral	1882	Đakovo	Croatia	
84.0 m (276 ft)		Gustav Adolfs Kyrka	1894	Sundsvall	Sweden	
84.0 m (276 ft)		Eglise Saint-André	1865	Reims	France	
84.0 m (276 ft)		St. Willibrord's Church	1891	Antwerp	Belgium	
84.0 m (276 ft)		Church of Our Lady	1450	Aarschot	Belgium	
84.0 m (276 ft)		Cathedral of St. Peter and Paul	1908	Brno	Czech Republic	
84.0 m (276 ft)		St. Mark's Church	1895	Chemnitz	Germany	
84.0 m (276 ft)		St. George	1494	Freising	Germany	
84.0 m (276 ft)		Sankt Michael	1883	Schwalmtal	Germany	
84.0 m (276 ft)		Münster Unseren Lieben Frau	1785	Zwiefalten	Germany	
84.0 m (276 ft)		Stadtpfarrkirche Linz (de)		Linz	Austria	
84.0 m (276 ft)		Mende Cathedral		Mende	France	
84.0 m (276 ft)	H D	Neurossgarten Church	1647	Kaliningrad	Russia	Heavily damaged in World War II, ruin removed in 1975
84.0 m (276 ft)		San Carlo al Corso	1847	Milan	Italy	
84.0 m (276 ft)		Ponte San Pietro Parish Church		Ponte San Pietro	Italy	
83.8 m (275 ft)		St. Paul's Cathedral	1888	Buffalo	United States	Height of large bell tower
83.7 m (249 ft)		Cathedral of St Peter	1221	Bautzen	Germany	
83.7 m (274 ft)		Orthodox Cathedral	1946	Timișoara	Romania	
83.5 m (275 ft)		St. Nicholas' Church		Löbau	Germany	
83.5 m (275 ft)		Blessed Mary Virgin of Angels	1900	Dąbrowa Górnicza	Poland	
83.5 m (274 ft)		St. Mary's Church	1292	Stargard	Poland	
83.3 m (273 ft)		La Basilique du Sacré-Coeur	1910	Paris	France	
83.2 m (273 ft)		Assumption Cathedral	1840	Ryazan	Russia	
83.2 m (273 ft)		First Presbyterian Church and Manse	1879	Baltimore	United States	
83.0 m (262 ft)		St. Johannis Church, Altona (de)	1873	Hamburg	Germany	
83.0 m (272 ft)		Herz-Jesu-Kirche	1909	Cologne	Germany	
83.0 m (272 ft)		St. Mary's Church	1896	Lünen	Germany	
83.0 m (272 ft)		St. Nicholas' Church	1465	Meran	Italy	
83.0 m (272 ft)		Church of San Giulio	1948	Castellanza	Italy	
83.0 m (272 ft)		Panthéon	1789	Paris	France	
83.0 m (272 ft)		Eglise Saint-Salomon-et-Saint-Grégoire de Pithiviers		Pithiviers	France	
83.0 m (272 ft)		Church of Saint-Maclou	1517	Rouen	France	
83.0 m (272 ft)		Lincoln Cathedral	1807	Lincoln	United Kingdom	Today 83 m tall — spire collapsed in 1549; tallest building in the world from 1311 to 1549. Was 103 metres from 1549 to 1807.
83.0 m (272 ft)		St Martin's Church	1466	Kortrijk	Belgium	
83.0 m (272 ft)		Sint-Hiloniuskerk	1868	Izegem	Belgium	
83.0 m (272 ft)		Our Lady of the Rosary Church	1976	Gdańsk	Poland	
83.0 m (272 ft)		St. Roch's Church	1946	Białystok	Poland	
83.0 m (272 ft)		Church of the Sacred Heart	1902	Olsztyn	Poland	
83.0 m (272 ft)		St. John the Baptist Cathedral	1977	Santa Cruz do Sul	Brazil	
83.0 m (272 ft)		Church of St. Gummarus	16th century	Lier	Belgium	
83.0 m (272 ft)		Church of St. Gummarus	1903	Steenbergen	Netherlands	
83.0 m (272 ft)		Tournai Cathedral	13th century	Tournai	Belgium	
83.0 m (272 ft)		Sankt Gangolf		Heinsberg	Germany	
83.0 m (272 ft)		Sankt Johannes		Dingolfing	Germany	
83.0 m (272 ft)		Sankt Lambertus		Erkelenz	Germany	
83.0 m (272 ft)		Marktkirche Unser Lieben Frauen		Halle	Germany	
83.0 m (272 ft)		Sankt Maria Rosenkranz		Mönchengladbach	Germany	
83.0 m (272 ft)		Sankt Johannes Baptist		Neheim	Germany	
83.0 m (272 ft)		Pfarrkirche Maria Alm (de)		Maria Alm am Steinernen Meer	Austria	
83.0 m (272 ft)		Mariä-Himmelfahrt-Kirche (de)		Bad Hofgastein	Austria	
83.0 m (272 ft)		Kőbányai Szent László-templom	1899	Budapest	Hungary	
83.0 m (272 ft)		Templo de La Luz del Mundo	1992	Guadalajara	Mexico	
83.0 m (272 ft)		Church of Our Lady of Suffrage and Saint Zita	1881	Turin	Italy	
83.0 m (272 ft)		Basilica of Our Lady of Itatí	1950	Itatí	Argentina	Tallest church dome in South America
82.9 m (272 ft)		St Botolph's Church	1520	Boston	United Kingdom	Tallest parish church tower (as opposed to spire) in England
82.46 m (271 ft)		Saint-Quirico-and-Giulitta Church		Tramin an der Weinstraße	Italy	
82.45 m (271 ft)		Church of the Assumption	1903	Bátaszék	Hungary	
82.4 m (271 ft)		St. Boniface Church	1884	Leeuwarden	Netherlands	
82.27 m (270 ft)		Holy Rosary Church	1922	Tacoma, Washington	United States	
82.27 m (270 ft)		Dolo San Rocco Church		Dolo	Italy	
82.18 m (270 ft)		St. Catherine's (de)		Braunschweig	Germany	
82.05 m (269 ft)		Vigodarzere Parish Church	1897	Vigodarzere	Italy	
82.0 m (269 ft)	H>100	Seville Cathedral	1198	Seville	Spain	Badly damaged by the 1356 earthquake. Replaced by a new Christian church, Seville Cathedral, between 1402 and 1506.
82.0 m (269 ft)		Chichester Cathedral	1863	Chichester	United Kingdom	Rebuilding of an earlier, slightly lower, spire that collapsed in 1861
82.0 m (269 ft)		St. Mary's Church, Gdańsk	1502	Gdańsk	Poland	Largest brick church in the world; the tower was never completed
82.0 m (269 ft)		Sankt Stephani	1507	Aschersleben	Germany	
82.0 m (269 ft)		Heiliggeistkirche	1544	Heidelberg	Germany	
82.0 m (269 ft)		St. Peter's Church	1887	Chemnitz	Germany	
82.0 m (269 ft)		Abbey of Santa Giustina	1599	Padua	Italy	
82.0 m (269 ft)		St. Peter and Paul Church	1758	Kastelruth	Italy	
82.0 m (269 ft)		Sankt Marien	1896	Hagen	Germany	
82.0 m (269 ft)		Radolfzell Minster	1903	Radolfzell	Germany	
82.0 m (269 ft)		St. Mary's Church		Stendal	Germany	
82.0 m (269 ft)		Church of Abbey of Saint-Étienne, Caen		Caen	France	
82.0 m (269 ft)		Sankt Alexander und Theodor	1766	Ottobeuren	Germany	
82.0 m (269 ft)		Stiftskirche Klosterneuburg		Klosterneuburg	Austria	
82.0 m (269 ft)		St. Primus' and St. Felician's Church (de)		Bad Gastein	Austria	
82.0 m (269 ft)		Stiftskirche Zwettl		Zwettl	Austria	
82.0 m (269 ft)		All Saints Cathedral	1825	Tula	Russia	
82.0 m (269 ft)		Buchs Lutheran Church	1932	Buchs	Switzerland	
82.0 m (269 ft)		St. Martin's Church	1917	Chur	Switzerland	
82.0 m (269 ft)	H<75	Reformation Church (Reformationskirche)	1907	Berlin-Moabit	Germany	Today 50 metres tall
81.85 m (269 ft)		Evangelische Stadtkirche Pforzheim	1968	Pforzheim	Germany	
81.8 m (294 ft)		St. Nicholas Church (Nikolaikirche)		Berlin-Mitte	Germany	
81.8 m (268 ft)		Cunerakerk	1531	Rhenen	Netherlands	
81.7 m (268 ft)		St. Elizabeth's Church	13th century	Marburg	Germany	
81.6 m (268 ft)		Holy Trinity Monastery	1854	Alatyr	Russia	
81.5 m (267 ft)		St. Nicholas Church	13th century	Bielefeld	Germany	
81.4 m (267 ft)		Bonn Minster		Bonn	Germany	
81.3 m (267 ft)		Erfurt Cathedral		Erfurt	Germany	
81.17 m (266 ft)		Schüttorf Saint Lorenz	1535	Schüttorf	Germany	
81.0 m (266 ft)		St. Nicholas' Church		Stendal	Germany	
81.0 m (266 ft)		Shrine of Our Lady of Saint Valeria	1965	Seregno	Italy	
81.0 m (266 ft)		Saint Stephen's Church	1937	Sesto San Giovanni	Italy	
81.0 m (266 ft)		Moulins Cathedral		Moulins	France	
81.0 m (266 ft)		St. Laurentius	1893	Schaan	Liechtenstein	
81.0 m (266 ft)		Martin Luther Church (Martin-Luther-Kirche)		Dresden-Äußere Neustadt	Germany	
81.0 m (266 ft)		St. Lorenz	13th century	Nuremberg	Germany	
81.0 m (266 ft)		Church of Our Lady before Týn	1510	Prague	Czech Republic	
81.0 m (266 ft)		Zwingli Church (Zwinglikirche) (de)	1908	Berlin-Friedrichshain	Germany	
81.0 m (266 ft)		Pfarrkirche Höchst		Höchst	Austria	
81.0 m (266 ft)		Ivan the Great Bell Tower	1543	Moscow	Russia	
81.0 m (266 ft)		Votive Church of Szeged	1930	Szeged	Hungary	
81.0 m (264 ft)	H<75	Holy Cross Church (Heilig-Kreuz-Kirche) (de)	1888	Berlin-Wilmersdorf	Germany	Today 59.3 metres tall
80.8 m (265 ft)		Saint Mary Immaculate		Santorso	Italy	
80.7 m (265 ft)		Fort Street Presbyterian Church	1855	Detroit	United States	
80.7 (265 ft)	H D	St. Joseph Cathedral	1927	Buffalo	United States	Two tall towers removed in 1927 because of damage, one of the towers was rebuilt but at a shorter height.
80.7 m (265 ft)		St. Anthony's Church	1894	Toledo	United States	
80.6 m (264 ft)		Saint Lambert Church	1863	Veghel	Netherlands	
80.5 m (264 ft)		St. Mary's Church	1414	Wismar	Germany	Nave damaged in World War II and demolished in 1960
80.4 m (264 ft)		Cathedral Santa Maria Nascente	1853	Cologna Veneta	Italy	
80.2 m (263 ft)		St. Suitbertus	1927	Düsseldorf	Germany	
80.0 m (262 ft)		Church of St. James the Greater	c 1350	Kutná Hora	Czech Republic	
80.0 m (262 ft)		St. Johannis, Harvestehude	1882	Hamburg	Germany	
80.0 m (262 ft)		St. Patroclus' Church		Soest	Germany	
80.0 m (262 ft)		St. Mary's Church (Marienkirche)	1893	Recklinghausen	Germany	
80.0 m (262 ft)		St. Sixtus' Church	1885	Haltern	Germany	
80.0 m (262 ft)		Church of the Immaculate Conception	1896	Düsseldorf	Germany	
80.0 m (262 ft)		St. Peter	1898	Düsseldorf	Germany	
80.0 m (262 ft)		Saint-Augustin	1871	Paris	France	
80.0 m (262 ft)		Autun Cathedral	1146	Autun	France	
80.0 m (262 ft)		Basílica Catedral Nuestra Señora de la Altagracia	1970	Higüey	Dominican Republic	
80.0 m (262 ft)		New Cathedral	1825	Brescia	Italy	
80.0 m (262 ft)		Gouwekerk	1904	Gouda	Netherlands	
80.0 m (262 ft)		St. Michael's Church	1487	Cluj-Napoca	Romania	The tower was built between 1511 and 1543, but was destroyed by fire in 1697. A second tower was built in 1744, also destroyed in 1763. The present neo-Gothic tower was built between 1837 and 1860.
80.0 m (262 ft)		Cathedral Basilica of the Holy Family	1926	Częstochowa	Poland	
80.0 m (262 ft)		St. Mary's Basilica	1406	Kraków	Poland	
80.0 m (262 ft)		Trinity Cathedral	1835	St. Petersburg	Russia	
80.0 m (262 ft)		Rózsafüzér Királynéja-templom		Budapest	Hungary	
80.0 m (262 ft)		Dormition Belfry	1910	Moscow	Russia	
80.0 m (264 ft)	H D	Melanchthon Church (Melanchthonkirche) (de)	1906	Berlin-Kreuzberg	Germany	Destroyed in World War II
80.0 m (262 ft)		St. Salvator's Cathedral	1871	Bruges	Belgium	
80.0 m (262 ft)		St. James' Church		Ghent	Belgium	
80.0 m (262 ft)		Sint-Petrus' Stoel van Antiochiëkerk	16th century	Sittard	Netherlands	
80.0 m (262 ft)		Basilica of Sant'Andrea	1765	Mantua	Italy	
80.0 m (262 ft)		Shrine of the Virgin of the Rosary of Pompei	1925	Pompei	Italy	
80.0 m (262 ft)		St. Matthew's Church	1928	Łódź	Poland	
80.0 m (262 ft)		Collegiate Church of the Holy Cross and St. Bartholomew	1477	Wrocław	Poland	
80.0 m (262 ft)		Annunciation Cathedral	1901	Kharkiv	Ukraine	
80.0 m (262 ft)		Unser Lieben Frauen	1586	Burg (bei Magdeburg)	Germany	
80.0 m (262 ft)		Christuskirche	1903	Mainz	Germany	
80.0 m (262 ft)		Marienkirche		Barth	Germany	
80.0 m (262 ft)		St. Marien	1902	Neuss	Germany	
80.0 m (262 ft)		Holy Family	1902	Kamen	Germany	
80.0 m (262 ft)		Dreikönigskirche	1880	Frankfurt	Germany	
80.0 m (262 ft)		Pfarrkirche St. Othmar unter den Weißgerbern (de)	1874	Vienna	Austria	
80.0 m (262 ft)		Pfarrkirche St. Elisabeth (de)	1868	Vienna	Austria	
80.0 m (262 ft)		Stadtpfarrkirche Steyr (de)		Steyr	Austria	
80.0 m (262 ft)		Santa Croce	1442	Florence	Italy	
80.0 m (262 ft)		John the Evangelist Monastery	1901	Poschupovo	Russia	
80.0 m (262 ft)		Christus Resurrection Church		Moscow	Russia	
80.0 m (262 ft)		Church of Abbaye de la Trinité		Vendôme	France	
80.0 m (262 ft)		Church of Notre-Dame of Dijon	1251	Dijon	France	
80.0 m (262 ft)		Church of Saint Michel	1667	Dijon	France	
80.0 m (262 ft)		Trinity Cathedral	2011	Bryansk	Russia	
80.0 m (262 ft)		St. Matthew's Church	1895	Basel	Switzerland	
80.0 m (262 ft)	H<75	Sankt Johannis		Herford	Germany	Demolished from 1906 to 1910, replaced by 71 metres tall tower
79.9 m (262 ft)		Dormition Cathedral		Astrakhan	Russia	
79.9 m (262 ft)		Stephanus Church (Stephanuskirche) (de)		Berlin-Gesundbrunnen	Germany	
79.8 m (262 ft)		Sint Petrus' Bandenkerk	1962	Venray	Netherlands	
79.8 m (262 ft)		St. Nicholas Church	1955	Meijel	Netherlands	
79.7 m (261 ft)		St. Joseph's Church	1894	Enschede	Netherlands	
79.6 m (261 ft)		Lausanne Cathedral	1235	Lausanne	Switzerland	
79.5 m (261 ft)		Fraumünster		Zürich	Switzerland	
79.5 m (261 ft)		John the Baptist Church	1895	Serpukhov	Russia	
79.42 m (261 ft)		Church of the Assumption	1885	Terlano	Italy	
79.3 m (260 ft)		St. Paul's Church		Hamm	Germany	
79.3 m (260 ft)		Artländer Dom	1900	Ankum	Germany	
79.3 m (260 ft)		St. Michael's Cathedral	1848	Toronto	Canada	
79.2 m (260 ft)		St. Christopher's Cathedral	1663	Roermond	Netherlands	
79.01m (259 ft)		Basilica of Our Lady of Dolours	1929	Thrissur	India	The 3rd tallest church in Asia
79.01m (259 ft)		Gesu Church	1894	Milwaukee	United States	Features two towers; the west tower, which features a belfry and a clock, is taller at 260 feet.
79.0 m (259 ft)		Sint-Hermesbasiliek		Ronse	Belgium	
79.0 m (259 ft)		Heuvelse kerk	1889	Tilburg	Netherlands	
79.0 m (259 ft)		Sint-Janskerk	1485	Maastricht	Netherlands	
79.0 m (259 ft)		Parroquia Inmaculado Corazón de María	1957	Lima	Peru	
79.0 m (259 ft)		Anykščiai Church	1908	Anykščiai	Lithuania	Tallest church in Lithuania
79.0 m (259 ft)		St. Mary Major Parish Church	1897	Monteforte d'Alpone	Italy	
79.0 m (259 ft)		San Lorenzo Church	1840	Pescantina	Italy	
79.0 m (259 ft)		Jakobskirche		Burghausen	Germany	
79.0 m (259 ft)		Michaeliskirche	1412	Lüneburg	Germany	
79.0 m (259 ft)		Los Angeles California Temple	1956	Los Angeles	United States	
79.0 m (259 ft)		Trinity Cathedral	1699	Pskov	Russia	
79.0 m (259 ft)		St. Nicholas Church	1755	Prague	Czech Republic	
79.0 m (259 ft)		Oude Kerk	1350	Delft	Netherlands	
79.0 m (259 ft)		Kerk van Heilig Kruisverheffing	1892	Raalte	Netherlands	
79.0 m (259 ft)		Sankt Laurentii	1718	Itzehoe	Germany	
79.0 m (259 ft)		St. Mary's Church	1300	Osnabrück	Germany	
79.0 m (259 ft)		Verona Cathedral		Verona	Italy	
79.0 m (259 ft)	H D	Saint Michaelschurch	1892	Zwolle	Netherlands	Demolished in 1965
78.8 m (258 ft)		Boston Avenue Methodist Church	1929	Tulsa, Oklahoma	United States	
78.8 m (258 ft)		Cerignola Cathedral	1934	Cerignola	Italy	
78.72 m (258 ft)		Sankt Lamberti	1899	Gladbeck	Germany	
78.5 m (258 ft)		Mont-Saint-Michel Abbey Church	1523	Mont-Saint-Michel	France	
78.5 m (258 ft)		St. Sophia Cathedral	1870	Vologda	Russia	
78.5 m (258 ft)		St. Mary's Church, Pasewalk		Pasewalk	Germany	
78.3 m (259 ft)		Church of Saint Sava	2020	Belgrade	Serbia	Tallest church in Serbia
78.3 m (257 ft)		Gemeentetoren	1771	Etten-Leur	Netherlands	
78.26 m (257 ft)		Salzburg Cathedral	17th century	Salzburg	Austria	
78.16 m (256 ft)		Budapest Matthias Church	1896	Budapest	Hungary	
78.15 m (256 ft)		Évreux Cathedral		Évreux	France	
78.14 m (256 ft)		St Theobald's Church	1841	Thann	France	
78.1 m (256 ft)		St. Anthony of Padua Church	1912	New Bedford, Mass.	United States	
78.1 m (256 ft)		Heinz Memorial Chapel	1938	Pittsburgh	United States	
78.0 m (256 ft)		Konstanz Minster	1853	Konstanz	Germany	
78.0 m (256 ft)		Church of the Holy Spirit (Heilige-Geist-Kirche) (de)		Berlin-Moabit	Germany	
78.0 m (256 ft)		Church of the Assumption	1320	Chełmno	Poland	
78.0 m (256 ft)		Saint Mary's Church	1908	Szczecinek	Poland	
78.0 m (256 ft)		Church of The Transfiguration	1902	Drezdenko	Poland	
78.0 m (256 ft)		Saint Augustinus	1909	Wrocław	Poland	
78.0 m (256 ft)		St. John's Basilica (St.-Johannes-Basilika)	1897	Berlin-Neukölln	Germany	
78.0 m (256 ft)		New Nazareth Church (Neue Nazarethkirche) (de)		Berlin-Wedding	Germany	
78.0 m (256 ft)		Stiftskirche		Baden-Baden	Germany	
78.0 m (256 ft)		Sofiakyrkan	1906	Stockholm	Sweden	
78.0 m (256 ft)		St. Jozefkathedraal	1887	Groningen	Netherlands	
78.0 m (256 ft)		St. Calixtusbasiliek	1908	Groenlo	Netherlands	
78 m (256 ft)		St. Matthew's German Evangelical Lutheran Church	1872	Charleston, South Carolina	United States	Tallest building in Charleston, tallest building in South Carolina for 101 years, designed by John Henry Devereux
78 m (256 ft)		Săpânța-Peri Monastery church	2003	Săpânța	Romania	Tallest wooden church in the world
78 m (256 ft)		Church of the Assumption	1888	Bratislava	Slovakia	
78.0 m (256 ft)		Kreisker chapel		Saint-Pol-de-Léon	France	
78.0 m (256 ft)		Sens Cathedral	1534	Sens	France	
78 m (248 ft)		Grote or Sint-Bavokerk	1520	Haarlem	Netherlands	
78.0 m (256 ft)		Senlis Cathedral	1191	Senlis	France	
78.0 m (256 ft)		Albi Cathedral	1480	Albi	France	
78.0 m (256 ft)		St. Martin's Church	16th century	Weert	Netherlands	
78.0 m (256 ft)		Wallfahrtskirche Schildthurn	1531	Zeilarn	Germany	
78.0 m (256 ft)		Liebfrauenkirche	1914	Bottrop	Germany	
78.0 m (256 ft)		Sankt Gundula	1901	Rhede	Germany	
78.0 m (256 ft)		Sacred Heart Church	1906	Ettlingen	Germany	
78.0 m (256 ft)		Sankt Johannes Baptist	1898	Willich	Germany	
78.0 m (256 ft)		St. John the Baptist	1234	Billerbeck	Germany	
78.0 m (256 ft)		Sankt-Annen-Kirche		Annaberg-Buchholz	Germany	
78.0 m (256 ft)		Sankt Martinus		Kerpen	Germany	
78.0 m (256 ft)		Kirche zum Heiligen Kreuz	1899	Frankfurt an der Oder	Germany	
78.0 m (256 ft)		Jesuitenkirche	1872	Heidelberg	Germany	
78.0 m (256 ft)		Sankt Andreas		Emsbüren	Germany	
78.0 m (256 ft)		Liebfrauenkirche		Krefeld	Germany	
78.0 m (256 ft)		Sankt Dionysius		Krefeld	Germany	
78.0 m (256 ft)		Altenburg Abbey		Altenburg	Austria	
78.0 m (256 ft)		Church of St Peter's Abbey		Salzburg	Austria	
78.0 m (256 ft)		Saint Michael		Vienna	Austria	
78.0 m (256 ft)		Pfarrkirche Schwanenstadt (de)		Schwanenstadt	Austria	
78.0 m (256 ft)		Novospassky Monastery		Moscow	Russia	
78.0 m (256 ft)		Church of the Nativity of the Blessed Virgin Mary	1846	Fonzaso	Italy	
78.0 m (256 ft)		St. Nicholas		Neuötting	Germany	
78.0 m (256 ft)		St. Ida	1903	Lippetal	Germany	
77.9 m (256 ft)		St. Mary's Church	1421	Bielefeld	Germany	
77.83 m (255 ft)		Saint Mary Assumption Church		Lana	Italy	
77.8 m (255 ft)		Monza Cathedral		Monza	Italy	
77.5 m (254 ft)		Kalvarija Church	1669	Vilnius	Lithuania	
77.45 m (254 ft)		Preposive Church of Saint Peter and Paul	1927	Lissone	Italy	
77.42 m (254 ft)		St. Augustine's Church	1878	London	United Kingdom	
77.4 m (254 ft)		St. Servatius' Church	1879	Dinther	Netherlands	
77.2 m (253 ft)		St. Bonaventure's Church	1892	Woerden	Netherlands	
77.0 m (253 ft)	H<75	Resurrection Church (Auferstehungskirche) (de)	1895	Berlin-Friedrichshain	Germany	Today 42 metres tall
77.0 m (253 ft)		Church of Christ	1894	Cologne	Germany	
77.0 m (253 ft)		St. Mary's Church	1892	Bonn	Germany	
77 m (253 ft)		Michael's Church	1905	Turku	Finland	
77 m (253 ft)		Saint Mary's Church	1929	Inowrocław	Poland	
77 m (253 ft)	H D	Haberberg Church	1753	Kaliningrad	Russia	Heavily damaged in World War II, ruin removed in 1953
77 m (253 ft)		Catholic Church of St. Peter and Paul		Bacău	Romania	
77 m (253 ft)		Transfiguration Cathedral	2001	Odesa	Ukraine	
77 m (253 ft)		Transfiguration Cathedral	1894	Dzerzhinsky	Russia	
77 m (253 ft)		St. Theodard's Church	1943	Beringen	Belgium	
77 m (253 ft)		Coutances Cathedral	1274	Coutances	France	
77 m (253 ft)		Angers Cathedral	1523	Angers	France	
77 m (253 ft)		Église Saint-Martin de Pau	1871	Pau	France	
77 m (253 ft)		Siena Cathedral	1263	Siena	Italy	
77 m (253 ft)		Nieuwstadtskerk	c 1440	Zutphen	Netherlands	
77 m (253 ft)		Church of the Annunciation	1901	Inowrocław	Poland	
77 m (253 ft)		Sankt Johann Baptist	1409	Pfaffenhofen an der Ilm	Germany	
77 m (253 ft)		Sankt Jodok	1470	Landshut	Germany	
77 m (253 ft)		Sankt Pölten Cathedral		Sankt Pölten	Austria	
77 m (253 ft)		Church of St Catherine of Alexandria	1909	Grybów	Poland	
77 m (253 ft)		Divine Mercy Sanctuary	2002	Kraków	Poland	
77 m (253 ft)		Sankt Nikolaus und Stephanus	1519	Eggenfelden	Germany	
77 m (253 ft)		St. Nicholas	1850	Potsdam	Germany	
77 m (253 ft)		Pfarrkirche Pischelsdorf am Kulm (de)		Pischelsdorf am Kulm	Austria	
77 m (253 ft)		Saint Mary Assumption Church	1892	Caltrano	Italy	
77 m (253 ft)		San Anastasi Church	1938	Villasanta	Italy	
76.8 m (252 ft)		Lichfield Cathedral	1340	Lichfield	United Kingdom	
76.8 m (252 ft)		Cathédrale Marie-Reine-du-Monde	1886	Montreal	Canada	
76.6 m (251 ft)		Bayeux Cathedral	1866	Bayeux	France	
76.5 m (281 ft)		St. Simeon Church (St.-Simeon-Kirche) (de)		Berlin-Kreuzberg	Germany	
76.4 m (251 ft)		St. Peter's Church	1913	Eindhoven	Netherlands	
76.2 m (250 ft)		Sint-Lambertusbasiliek	1890	Hengelo	Netherlands	
76.2 m (250 ft)		Basilica of Saint Mary	1914	Minneapolis	United States	The first basilica established in the United States of America
76.2 m (250 ft)		Basilica of St. Josaphat	1901	Milwaukee	United States	Featuring a large copper dome said to be modeled on that of the Vatican's St. Peter's Basilica, it was proclaimed the third minor basilica in the U.S. by Pope Pius XI in 1929.
76 m (249 ft)		Aachen Cathedral		Aachen	Germany	Height of the west tower
76.0 m (249 ft)		Sainte-Chapelle	1248	Paris	France	
76 m (249 ft)		Quimper Cathedral	1856	Quimper	France	
76 m (249 ft)		Église Saint-Paul	1897	Strasbourg	France	
76 m (249 ft)		Cathedral of St. Nicholas	1430	Fribourg	Switzerland	
76 m (249 ft)		Trier Cathedral	4th century	Trier	Germany	
76 m (249 ft)		St. Walpurga's Church	c 1485	Zutphen	Netherlands	
76 m (249 ft)		St. Sophia Cathedral		Kyiv	Ukraine	
76 m (249 ft)		St. Catherine's Church	1841	Maaseik	Belgium	
76 m (249 ft)		Santiago de Compostela Cathedral	1128	Santiago de Compostela	Spain	
76 m (249 ft)		Church of St. Catherine	17th century	Gdańsk	Poland	
76 m (249 ft)		Cathedral of Our Lady of Kazan		Stavropol	Russia	
76 m (249 ft)		Basiliek van Onze Lieve Vrouwe Tenhemelopneming	c 1540	Zwolle	Netherlands	
76 m (249 ft)		Sankt Pankratius	1896	Oberhausen	Germany	
76 m (249 ft)		Sankt Nikolaus	1907	Kappelrodeck	Germany	
76 m (249 ft)		Herz Mariä Kirche	1967	Diedorf	Germany	
76 m (249 ft)		Truro Cathedral	1910	Truro	United Kingdom	
76 m (249 ft)		Bamberg Cathedral	1237	Bamberg	Germany	
76 m (249 ft)		Brüderkirche	1905	Altenburg	Germany	
76 m (249 ft)		Sankt-Aegidien-Kirche	1849	Oschatz	Germany	
76 m (249 ft)		Lutherkirche	1897	Kassel	Germany	
76 m (249 ft)		Sankt Remigus		Borken	Germany	
76 m (249 ft)		Sankt Pankratius		Gescher	Germany	
76 m (249 ft)	H D	Christuskirche		Aachen	Germany	Damaged in World War II, 1959: demolition, except of the church tower, 1979: demolition of the church tower after a fire
76 m (249 ft)		Rudolfsheimer Pfarrkirche (de)	1898	Vienna	Austria	
76 m (249 ft)		Stiftskirche Engelszell	1764	Engelhartszell	Austria	
76 m (249 ft)		Resurrection Cathedral	1886	Kashin	Russia	
76 m (249 ft)		Church of Palanga	1908	Palanga	Lithuania	
76 m (249 ft)		Santuario Nacional Nuestra Señora de Coromoto	1996	Guanare	Venezuela	
76 m (249 ft)		Temple Expiatori del Sagrat Cor	1902	Barcelona	Spain	
76 m (249 ft)		Oscarskyrkan	1903	Stockholm	Sweden	
76 m (249 ft)		Vaksala Church	1150	Uppsala	Sweden	The exact date of completion is unknown but predates 1164.
76 m (249 ft)		Catherine Church	1724	Stockholm	Sweden	
76 m (249 ft)		Barclay Church	1864	Edinburgh	United Kingdom	
76 m (249 ft)		Erzsébetváros Árpád-házi Szent Erzsébet-plébániatemplom		Budapest	Hungary	
76 m (249 ft)		San Stefano Church	1940	Buja	Italy	
76 m (249 ft)		Basilica della Santa Casa	1754	Loreto	Italy	
75.9 m (249 ft)		Sint-Lambertuskerk	1467	Nederweert	Netherlands	
75.7 m (248 ft)		Roskilde Cathedral	1405	Roskilde	Denmark	
75.7 m (248 ft)		Der Aa-kerk	1712	Groningen	Netherlands	
75.6 m (248 ft)		Church of the immaculate conception of the Blessed Virgin Mary		Szczecin	Poland	
75.6 m (248 ft)		Igreja dos Clérigos	1763	Porto	Portugal	
75.6 m (248 ft)		Trinity Cathedral	1857	Morshansk	Russia	
75.6 m (248 ft)		Basilica of St. Nicholas	1887	IJsselstein	Netherlands	
75.6 m (248 ft)		Tobolsk Kremlin	1809	Tobolsk	Russia	
75.5 m (248 ft)		St. Nicholas' Church Spandau (St.-Nikolai-Kirche Spandau) (de)		Berlin-Spandau	Germany	
75.5 m (248 ft)		Sts. Peter and Paul Cathedral	1900	Gliwice	Poland	
75.4 m (247 ft)		St. Mary and Andreas		Rathenow	Germany	
75.3 m (247 ft)		St. Florian Catholic Church	1928	Hamtramck	United States	
75.3 m (247 ft)		Cathedral Church of All Saints	1905	Wakefield	United Kingdom	
75.1 m (246 ft)		San Giovanni Battista Church		Stezzano	Italy	
75.0 m (246 ft)		St. Stephen's Church		Bremen	Germany	
75.0 m (246 ft)		St. Mauritius	1901	Frankfurt	Germany	
75.0 m (246 ft)		Jesuit Church		Mannheim	Germany	
75.0 m (246 ft)		Church of the Ascension (Himmelfahrtskirche)		Dresden-Leuben	Germany	
75.0 m (246 ft)		Church of the Holy Spirit (Heilig-Geist-Kirche)		Dresden-Blasewitz	Germany	
75.0 m (246 ft)		Church of the Blessing (Segenskirche) (de)		Berlin-Prenzlauer Berg	Germany	
75.0 m (246 ft)		Great St. Martin's Church		Cologne	Germany	
75.0 m (246 ft)		Saint Michael's Church	1890	Rochester	United States	
75.0 m (246 ft)		New Old South Church	1875	Boston	United States	
75 m (246 ft)		Lutheran Church of Bistrița	1564	Bistrița	Romania	
75.0 m (246 ft)		Zuider- of St. Pancrastoren	1524	Enkhuizen	Netherlands	
75.0 m (246 ft)		St. Sebaldus Church	13th century	Nuremberg	Germany	
75.0 m (246 ft)		St. Nicholas Church	1843	Venyov	Russia	
75.0 m (246 ft)		St. Nicholas Church	1165	Leipzig	Germany	
75.0 m (246 ft)		St. Martin's Church	1887	Twello	Netherlands	
75.0 m (246 ft)		Fortaleza Cathedral	1978	Fortaleza	Brazil	
75.0 m (246 ft)		Rio de Janeiro Cathedral	1979	Rio de Janeiro	Brazil	
75.0 m (246 ft)		Kostel Svatého Cyrila a Metoděje	1863	Prague	Czech Republic	
75.0 m (246 ft)		St. Prokopius Church	1903	Prague	Czech Republic	
75.0 m (246 ft)		Joniskio St. Blessed Virgin Mary of the Assumption Church	1901	Joniškis	Lithuania	
75.0 m (246 ft)		St. Boniface's Church	1897	Rijswijk	Netherlands	
75.0 m (246 ft)		Sint-Werenfriduskerk	1899	Zieuwent	Netherlands	
75.0 m (246 ft)		Heilige Maria Presentatiekerk	1901	Asten	Netherlands	
75.0 m (246 ft)		Siedlce Cathedral	1912	Siedlce	Poland	
75.0 m (246 ft)		Church of the Transfiguration	1914	Garbów	Poland	
75.0 m (246 ft)		St. Nicholas Church	1902	Racibórz	Poland	
75.0 m (246 ft)		Church of St. Mary Magdalene	1892	Chorzów	Poland	
75.0 m (246 ft)		Church of St. Andrew Bobola	1902	Chorzów	Poland	
75.0 m (246 ft)		Church of Our Lady	1850	Boom	Belgium	
75.0 m (246 ft)		Saint-Servais Church	1871	Brussels	Belgium	
75.0 m (246 ft)		Church of Jesus	1772	Cieszyn	Poland	
75.0 m (246 ft)		Collegiate Church of the Annunciation	1842	Głogów	Poland	
75.0 m (246 ft)		Basilica di San Giorgio Maggiore	1791	Venice	Italy	
75.0 m (246 ft)		Strängnäs Cathedral	1742	Strängnäs	Sweden	
75.0 m (246 ft)		St. Michaelis Church	1891	Chemnitz	Germany	
75.0 m (246 ft)		Stadtkirche Sankt Michael	1557	Jena	Germany	
75.0 m (246 ft)		Stift Haug	1691	Würzburg	Germany	
75.0 m (246 ft)		Mariä Geburt		Rottenbuch	Germany	
75.0 m (246 ft)		Sankt Nikolaus	1904	Übersee	Germany	
75.0 m (246 ft)		Apostelkirche	1900	Viernheim	Germany	
75.0 m (246 ft)		Sankt Vitus	1900	Philippsburg	Germany	
75.0 m (246 ft)		Sankt Martin		Euskirchen	Germany	
75.0 m (246 ft)		Sankt Johannes Baptist		Altenberge	Germany	
75.0 m (246 ft)		Sankt Ludgerus	1895	Weseke	Germany	
75.0 m (246 ft)		Sankt Johannes	1904	Suderwich	Germany	
75.0 m (246 ft)		Mariä Himmelfahrt	1722	Schuttern	Germany	
75.0 m (246 ft)		Basilika Vierzehnheiligen	1772	Bad Staffelstein	Germany	
75.0 m (246 ft)		Neustädter Kirche	1520	Eschwege	Germany	
75.0 m (246 ft)		Heilig-Kreuz-Münster		Rottweil	Germany	
75.0 m (246 ft)		Trinity Church	1897	Riesa	Germany	
75.0 m (246 ft)		St. Paul's Church	1898	Heidenheim an der Brenz	Germany	
75.0 m (246 ft)		St. Petri's Church		Buxtehude	Germany	
75.0 m (246 ft)		Church of Our Lady	1903	Recklinghausen	Germany	
75.0 m (246 ft)		St. Johannes Church	1904	Recklinghausen	Germany	
75.0 m (246 ft)		St. Hippolytus	1898	Gelsenkirchen	Germany	
75.0 m (246 ft)		St. Nicholas Church	1893	Aue	Germany	
75.0 m (246 ft)		St. Martin Church	1865	Sendenhorst	Germany	
75.0 m (246 ft)		Church of St Mary of the Assumption		Vilsbiburg	Germany	
75.0 m (246 ft)	H<75	St. Joseph	1888	Münster	Germany	Towers were destroyed in World War II, today less tall.
75.0 m (246 ft)		Église Notre-Dame de Niort		Niort	France	
75.0 m (246 ft)		Church of Saint-Pierre		Caen	France	
75.0 m (246 ft)		Stadtpfarrkirche Rohrbach (de)	1700	Rohrbach in Oberösterreich	Austria	
75.0 m (246 ft)		Pfarrkirche Vöcklamarkt (de)	1722	Vöcklamarkt	Austria	
75.0 m (246 ft)		Pfarrkirche Radstadt (de)	1879	Radstadt	Austria	
75.0 m (246 ft)		Saint Andrew Bobola's Church	1903	Bydgoszcz	Poland	
75.0 m (246 ft)		Resurrection Church		Drawsko Pomorskie	Poland	
75.0 m (246 ft)		St. Florian's Cathedral	1904	Warsaw	Poland	
75.0 m (246 ft)		Temple of Divine Providence	2016	Warsaw	Poland	
75.0 m (246 ft)		Basilica di Santa Maria Maggiore	1750	Rome	Italy	
75.0 m (246 ft)		Basílica Nuestra Señora de los Buenos Aires	1911	Buenos Aires	Argentina	
75.0 m (246 ft)		Sint-Agathakerk	1903	Lisse	Netherlands	
75.0 m (246 ft)		Peperbus	1483	Zwolle	Netherlands	
75.0 m (246 ft)	H D	Sint Antonius van Paduakerk Blerick	1899	Venlo	Netherlands	Destroyed in 1944
75.0 m (246 ft)		Budapest Alcantarai Szent Péter-templom		Budapest	Hungary	
75.0 m (246 ft)		Grace Episcopal Cathedral	1915	San Francisco	United States	
75.0 m (246 ft)		Rostov-on-Don Cathedral		Rostov-on-Don	Russia	
75.0 m (246 ft)		Oscar Fredriks Kyrka	1893	Gothenburg	Sweden	
75.0 m (246 ft)		St John the Baptist Basilica	1973	Xewkija	Malta	
75.0 m (246 ft)		Basilica del Roble	1964	Monterrey	Mexico	
75.0 m (246 ft)		Catedral del Señor de Tabasco	1965	Villahermosa	Mexico	
75.0 m (246 ft)		St. Mary's Church	1894	Oberhausen	Germany	
75.0 m (246 ft)		St. Jakob	1898	Köthen	Germany	
75.0 m (246 ft)		Sacred Heart Church of St. Ottilien Archabbey	1899	Eresing	Germany	
75.0 m (246 ft)		La Torre Monumental a la Fe	2011	Silao	Mexico	
75.0 m (246 ft)		San Pietro Apostolo Church	1921	Azzano Decimo	Italy	
75.0 m (246 ft)		Saint Mary's on the Hill Church	1896	Montebelluna	Italy	
75.0 m (246 ft)		Saint Peter and Paul Church		Pederobba	Italy	
75.0 m (246 ft)		San Giovanni Evangelista	1613	Parma	Italy	
75.0 m (246 ft)		Santa Maria del Carmine	1450	Pavia	Italy	
75.0 m (246 ft)		Sanctuary of the Blessed Virgin of the Sorrows		Rho	Italy	
75.0 m (246 ft)		St. Mary's Cathedral	1922	San Donà di Piave	Italy	
75.0 m (246 ft)		San Giorgio Church	1767	San Giorgio di Lomellina	Italy	
75.0 m (246 ft)		Santa Lucia Church	1926	Santa Lucia di Piave	Italy	
75.0 m (246 ft)		Church of the Assumption	1927	Solesino	Italy	
75.0 m (246 ft)		Basilica of Superga	1731	Turin	Italy	
75.0 m (246 ft)		Amriswil Lutheran Church	1892	Amriswil	Switzerland	
75.0 m (246 ft)		Richterswil Reformed Church	1905	Richterswil	Switzerland	
75.0 m (246 ft)	H D	Lutheran Cathedral of Vyborg	1893	Vyborg	Russia	Destroyed in 1944
75.0 m (246 ft)	H D	Vamlingbo Church		Gotland	Sweden	Tower collapsed in 1817
75.0 m (246 ft)	H<75	Saint Gertrud's Church, Essen	1877	Essen	Germany	Destroyed in an air-raid on March 5, 1943, actual height: 59 metres
75.0 m (246 ft)	H<75	Saint Joseph's Church, Saarbrücken	1910	Saarbrücken	Germany	Pinnacle destroyed in an air-raid on October 4, 1944, actual height: 48 metres
75.0 m (246 ft)	H<75	St. Peter, Oldenburg	1885	Oldenburg	Germany	Pinnacle was destroyed in 1972 in a storm, actual height: 61 metres
75.0 m (246 ft)	H<75	Valladolid Cathedral	1709	Valladolid	Spain	Old tower collapsed in 1841, actual height: 69 metres
75.0 m (246 ft)	H<75	Sacred Heart, Oberhausen	1912	Oberhausen	Germany	Pinnacle destroyed in an air-raid in 1943, today lower
75.0 m (246 ft)	H D	Paulinerkirche		Leipzig	Germany	Demolished in 1968
75.0 m (246 ft)	H D	Alte Christuskirche Barmen		Wuppertal	Germany	Destroyed in an air-raid on May 30, 1943, debris demolished in 1955
75.0 m (246 ft)	H D	Reconciliation Church (Versöhnungskirche) (de)		Berlin-Mitte	Germany	Demolished in 1985
75.0 m (246 ft)	H<75	Church of Wusseken	1514	Sarnow-Wusseken	Germany	Tower collapsed in 1659, today lower

== Under construction ==
Name	Image	Current height	Planned height	Completion	City	Christian denomination	Notes
Sagrada Família		172.50 m (566 ft)	172.50 m (566 ft)	est. 2034	Barcelona	Catholic	Became the tallest church building in October 2025. Height of the Tower of Jesus Christ reached 172,5 meters high on February 20, 2026.
St Nicholas' Church		58.00 m (190 ft)	103.00 m (338 ft)	est. 2028	Anklam	formerly Lutheran (deconsecrated)	Destroyed in 1945, under reconstruction since 1995. The church was deconsecrated and is being rebuilt as part of the Ikareum project, and will house, among other things, the "IKAREUM – Lilienthal Flight Museum".
Garrison Church		57.00 m (187 ft)	88.43 m (290 ft)	2027	Potsdam	Lutheran	The church tower is being rebuilt since 2017. The "Chapel of the Cross of Nails" (Nagelkreuzkapelle) in the newly erected tower was consecrated in 2024.

== Historic (church buildings that have since been reduced in size) ==
Height metres (feet)	H	Name of Church	Religious denomination	Coordinates	Completed	City	Country	Notes
159.7 m (524 ft)	H>75	Lincoln Cathedral	Church of England	53.234374°N 0.536281°W	1311	Lincoln	United Kingdom	Today 83 m tall — spire collapsed in a storm in 1549; reputedly the tallest building in the world from 1311 to 1549; was 103 metres from 1549 to 1807.
153 m (502 ft)	H<75	Beauvais Cathedral	Catholic	49.432636°N 2.081483°E	1569	Beauvais	France	tower collapsed in 1573, today towerless and 48.5 m (153 ft) tall; World's tallest building from 1569 to 1573.
151.0 m (495 ft)	H>100	St. Mary's church	Lutheran	54.309972°N 13.087383°E	1478	Stralsund	Germany	Today 104 m tall — spire destroyed by lightning in 1647; World's tallest building from 1549 to 1647 (excepting 1569–1573)
150.3 m (493 ft)	H>100	Old St Paul's Cathedral	Church of England	51.513931°N 0.098306°W	1240; 1314 (spire completed)	London	United Kingdom	Spire destroyed by lightning in 1561 — church destroyed in the Great Fire in 1666
140 m (459 ft)	H>75	Riga Cathedral	Lutheran	56.949167°N 24.104444°E	1595	Riga	Latvia	demolished in 1775 - today 90 m tall
134.5 m (441 ft)	H D	Notre-Dame-et-Saint-Lambert	Catholic	50.645298°N 5.574151°E	1433	Liège	Belgium	Destroyed by the Liégeois in 1794 after the French Revolution
132.0 m (433 ft)	H<75	Nikolaikirche (Rostock)	Lutheran	54.087791°N 12.146269°E	1312	Rostock	Germany	destroyed in a storm in 1703, replaced afterwards by an 84 metres tall tower, which was destroyed in an air-raid in 1942, height of actual tower: 65 metres
131.3 m (431 ft)	H<75	Malmesbury Abbey	Church of England	51.584679°N 2.098333°W	1180	Malmesbury	United Kingdom	Spire collapsed in the late 15th or early 16th century
130.0 m (426 ft)	H>75	St. Elizabeth's Church	Catholic	51.111479°N 17.029924°E	1535	Wrocław	Poland	Today 91.5 metres (300 ft) tall; spire collapsed in 1529 during storm
122.3 m (400 ft) (source missing)	H<75	Abbaye-aux-Hommes	Catholic	49.181821°N 0.372749°W	13th century	Caen	France	Collapsed in 1566, spire replaced by a shorter tower in the 17th century
120 m (394 ft)	H>75	Copenhagen Cathedral	Lutheran	55.404560°N 12.342100°E	1738	Copenhagen	Denmark	Tower destroyed 1807 by the British bombing of Copenhagen, height of tower today: 58.5 metres (192 feet)
120 m (394 ft)	H>75	St. Mary's Church, Wismar	Lutheran	53.891202°N 11.462911°E	1414	Wismar	Germany	Tower destroyed around 1500, height of tower today: 80.5 metres (264 feet)
120 m (394 ft)	H<75	St. Nicholas' Church, Wismar	Lutheran	53.895611°N 11.465033°E	1508	Wismar	Germany	Tower collapsed on December 8, 1703, in a storm, height of tower today 64 metres (210 feet)
119.8 m (392 ft)	H>100	Cathedral Basilica of St James the Apostle	Catholic	53.424662°N 14.555576°E	1892	Szczecin	Poland	Cathedral tower collapsed during a bombardment in 1944 and currently measures 110.18 m
118.3 m (387 ft)	H>75	Saint Steven Cathedral	Catholic	49.120070°N 6.175252°E	1468	Metz	France	
115.0 m (376 ft)	H<75	Grote or Sint-Michaëlskerk	Protestant	52.511873°N 6.091668°E	1452	Zwolle	Netherlands	Tower collapsed on December 17, 1682. Church is still standing
114.8 m (376 ft)	H D	Collegiate church of St. Mary Magdalene	Catholic	52.406831°N 16.935903°E	14th or 15th century	Poznań	Poland	Destroyed in a fire in 1777, finally demolished in 1802
114.0 m (381 ft)	H>75	Berlin Cathedral (Berliner Dom)	United and uniting churches	52.519160°N 13.401057°E	1905	Berlin-Mitte	Germany	
114 m (381 ft)	H D	Old Cambrai Cathedral	Catholic	50.176054°N 3.229683°E	1472	Cambrai	France	Destroyed after 1796
113.0 m (371 ft)	H<75	Kaiser Wilhelm Memorial Church (Kaiser-Wilhelm-Gedächtniskirche)	Lutheran	52.504784°N 13.335055°E	1895	Berlin-Charlottenburg	Germany	Spire damaged in World War II, actual height of tower: 71 m
112.0 m (390 ft)	H>100	Reinoldikirche	Lutheran	51.514745°N 7.467157°E	1520	Dortmund	Germany	Built in 1454 with 112 metres (367 ft), collapsed in earthquake 1661, now 104 metres (341 ft)
111.0 m (364 ft)	H D	St. Peter's Church (Petrikirche)	Lutheran	52.513333°N 13.404167°E	1853	Berlin-Mitte	Germany	destroyed at the end of World War II, last relicts were removed in 1964
110 m (360 ft)	H<75	Pieterskerk, Leiden	Protestant	52.157552°N 4.487132°E	1570	Leiden	Netherlands	Today towerless — tower collapsed in 1512
110 m (360 ft)	H>100	St. John's Church	Lutheran	53.247758°N 10.412392°E	1384	Lüneburg	Germany	Today 108.7 m tall — spire partially destroyed by lightning in 1406
107.5 m (352.7 ft)	H>75	St. Walburga's Church, Zutphen	Protestant	52.139586°N 6.1957°E	15th century	Zutphen	Netherlands	Today 76 m tall. Gothic spire burned in 1600 due to a lightning strike.
106.0 m (348 ft)	H<75	St. Salvator's Church	Catholic	51.435895°N 6.760760°E	1415	Duisburg	Germany	destroyed by fire in 1467
105.0 m (344 ft)	H D	St. George's Church (Georgenkirche)	Lutheran	52.522408°N 13.416453°E	1898	Berlin-Mitte	Germany	Heavily damaged in World War II, demolished in 1949
103.0 m (338 ft)	H<75	Nikolaikirche, Anklam	Lutheran	53.856496°N 13.689217°E		Anklam	Germany	destroyed on April 29, 1945, by artillery fire, actual height of tower: 58 metres
102.0 m (334 ft)	H>75	Martinikerk (Groningen)	Protestant	53.219374°N 6.568215°E	1548	Groningen	Netherlands	Spire burned down in 1577, now 97 metres (318 ft) in height
102.0 m (334 ft)	H<75	St. Otger	Catholic	51.992908°N 6.917516°E	1892	Stadtlohn	Germany	destroyed in March 1945, rebuilt 74 metres tall
102.0 m (334 ft)	H<75	Sacred Heart Church	Catholic	51.246667°N 6.778943°E	1907	Düsseldorf	Germany	Spire destroyed on May 17, 1945, by a tornado, actual height of tower 56.43 metres
100.0 m (328 ft)	H<75	Marienkirche, Anklam	Lutheran	53.855798°N 13.684298°E	1888	Anklam	Germany	destroyed in an air-raid in 1943, actual height of tower: 64 metres
100.0 m (328 ft)	H<75	Saint Peter and Paul	Catholic	50.024698°N 8.120981°E		Eltville	Germany	Spire destroyed in 1683 by lightning, actual height of tower: 67 metres
100.0 m (328 ft)	H D	Düren Saint Anna Church	Catholic	50.801137899°N 6.4836586656°E	1884	Düren	Germany	destroyed in an air-raid on November 16, 1944
100.0 m (328 ft)	H D	Marienkirche Stettin	Lutheran	53.4270499°N 14.557200°E	1266	Szczecin	Poland	destroyed by lightning on July 9, 1789, last relicts were removed in 1830
100.0 m (328 ft)	H D	Eisenach Cathedral	Catholic	50.971292°N 10.32177329°E	1330	Eisenach	Germany	demolished
< 100.0 m (328 ft)	H<75	Wetter Saint Mary Collegiate Church	Lutheran	50.901223°N 8.723670°E	1506	Wetter	Germany	In 1783 the height of the church tower was reduced and in 1869 it was completely demolished. In 1871 a new church tower was built, whose height was enlarged to 62 metres in 1957/1958.

== Auxiliary list ==
This list completely follows the pattern of the main list (≥ 99 m). Church buildings are placed here that have been removed from the main list because the data about them is disputed or contradictory, or there is no information about the respective church building anywhere on the Internet. The purpose of this list is to preserve the work and efforts of the authors who have included some church buildings with a disputed place in the main list. In this way their work is preserved, and if it is proved that the excluded church buildings have a place in the main list, they can easily be restored to it (since the present list follows the pattern of the main list completely).

Rank	Name of Church	Image	Height metres (feet)	Completed	Location	Country	Christian denomination	Coordinates	Notes
50	Our Lady of the Immaculate Conception		110 m (361 ft)	2018	Ninh Bình	Vietnam	Catholic	20.353746°N 105.898636°E	
65-70	Wing Kwong Pentecostal Holiness Church		105.0 m (344 ft)	2000	Hong Kong	China	Lutheran	22.336168°N 114.189399°E	
76	Santuário Santa Isabel Rainha (Separate bell tower)		90 m (295 ft)	1958	São Paulo	Brazil	Catholic	23.558315°S 46.539328°W	More reliable source: Bell tower max height is 90 m. Dome max height is 64 m.

== See also ==
- List of tallest Orthodox church buildings
- List of tallest domes
- List of largest church buildings
- List of highest church naves
- List of tallest crosses
- List of towers
- List of tallest church buildings in the United Kingdom
