= St. Nicomedes' Church, Steinfurt =

Church in Steinfurt, Germany

Coordinates: 52.1265°N 7.3980°E

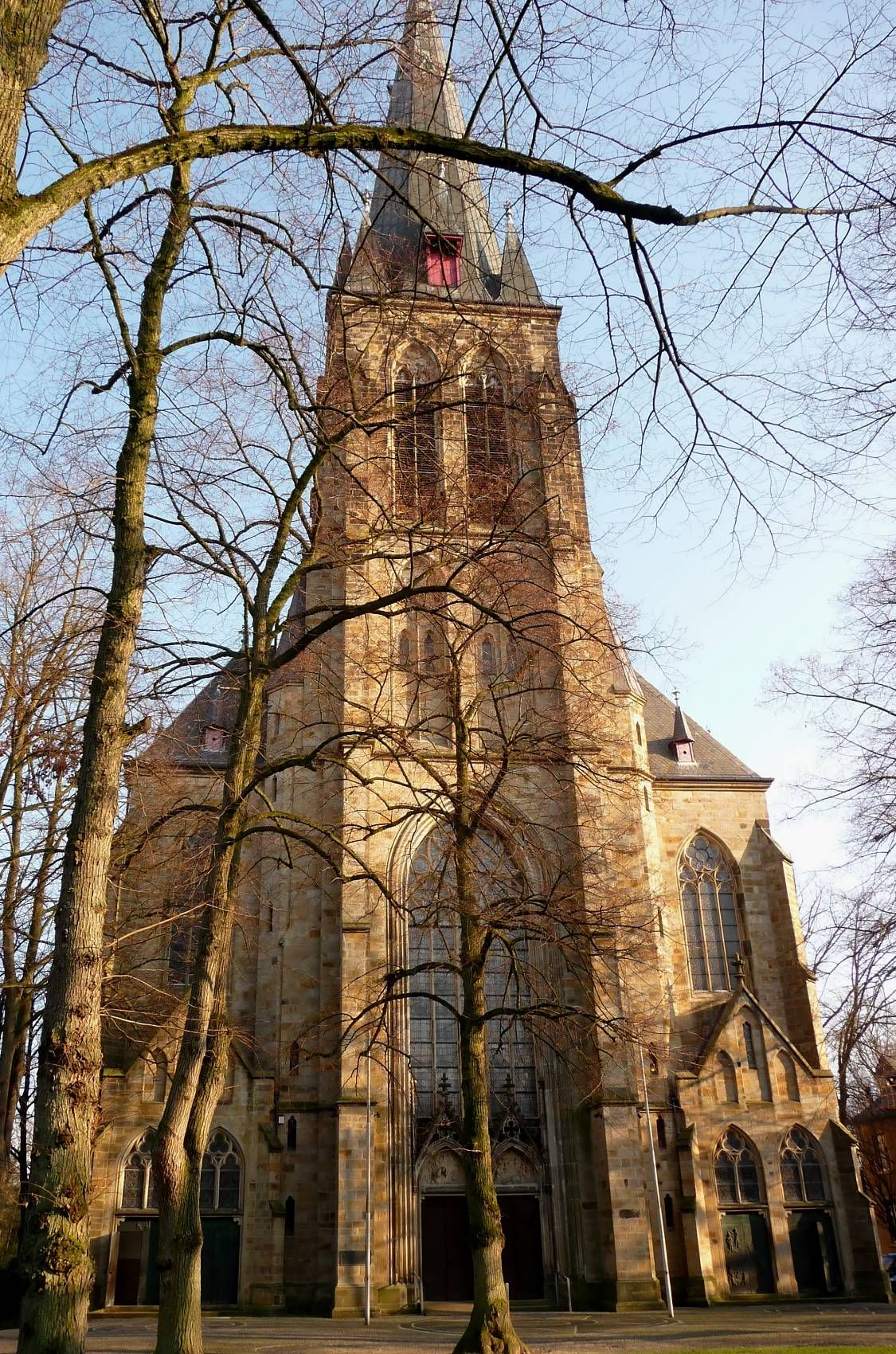

St. Nicomedes' Church is the Catholic church of Borghorst, a place belonging to the city of Steinfurt.

== History and architecture ==
The church stands on the site of the former collegiate church of Borghorst Abbey, which was demolished in 1885. It was built from 1885 to 1889 by Hilger Hertel the Elder. The building is a neo-Gothic style hall church with ashlar facades. The tower of the church is 99 meters high and thus after the St. Antonius Basilica in Rheine (102.5 meters) and the Ludgerusdom in Billerbeck (100 meters) the third highest church tower in the Münsterland.

== Amenities ==
The most important piece of equipment from St. Nicomedes is a golden reliquary cross, the so-called Borghorster Stiftskreuz. This is one of the most important Ottonian goldsmith works in Westphalia. The place of origin is not known, it was created in the 11th century. It has a wooden core and is covered with gold sheet on the front and copper sheet on the back.

The cross was stolen from the church on October 29, 2013. In February 2017, the work of art, which was insured for several million euros, was seized and the three perpetrators from Bremen who have since been identified were sentenced to several years in prison. After a detailed examination and implementation of the presentation and security concept in 2018, the work of art is to return to the church shortly.

St. Nicomedes has over 40 windows (areas), which were designed in color by different artists.

A number of windows, especially in the choir room and on the gallery, were designed by the company Hertel & Lersch in the years 1885 to 1886. They show biblical scenes such as Jesus on the Mount of Olives, the flagellation of Jesus, Mary and John under the cross, and also figures of saints (St. Liudger, St. Nicomedes of Rome, St. Lawrence of Rome).

A number of windows, especially in the aisles, were created by the artist Paul Weigmann. Some of them date from 1978 and show ornaments from symbols of Heavenly Jerusalem (merlons, towers, gates) and saints and righteous (including St. Liudger, St. Paul, Mary Queen of the Rosary, Adolf Kolping, Arnold Janssen, Clemens August von Galen, Maximilian Kolbe). Other windows were designed by Weigmann in 1984–1985; they show biblical scenes, such as B. the coronation of Mary, the marriage at Cana, the tree of life. Fragments of the historical glazing can be found in the tracery of a number of windows.

The organ was built in 1926-1927 by the organ builder Ludwig Fleiter (Münster). The originally German-Romantic instrument with orchestral tones was "baroqueized" after the Second World War in accordance with the sound ideals that were emerging at the time.

The instrument originally stood as a unit on the northern west gallery. After installing a new organ gallery in the tower of the church, the positive of the new gallery was set up in a separate housing; later the housing of the positive was renewed by the organ building company Fleiter and adapted to the prospectus on the north gallery. Part of the registers of the positive, the chamades, are in their own organ case on the southern west gallery.

The instrument has 68 registers on three manual works and pedal. The playing and register actions are electropneumatic.

The windows in the monastery chapel were created in 1968 by the artist Franz Heilmann.
