= St Anthony's Basilica, Rheine =

Church in Rheine, Germany

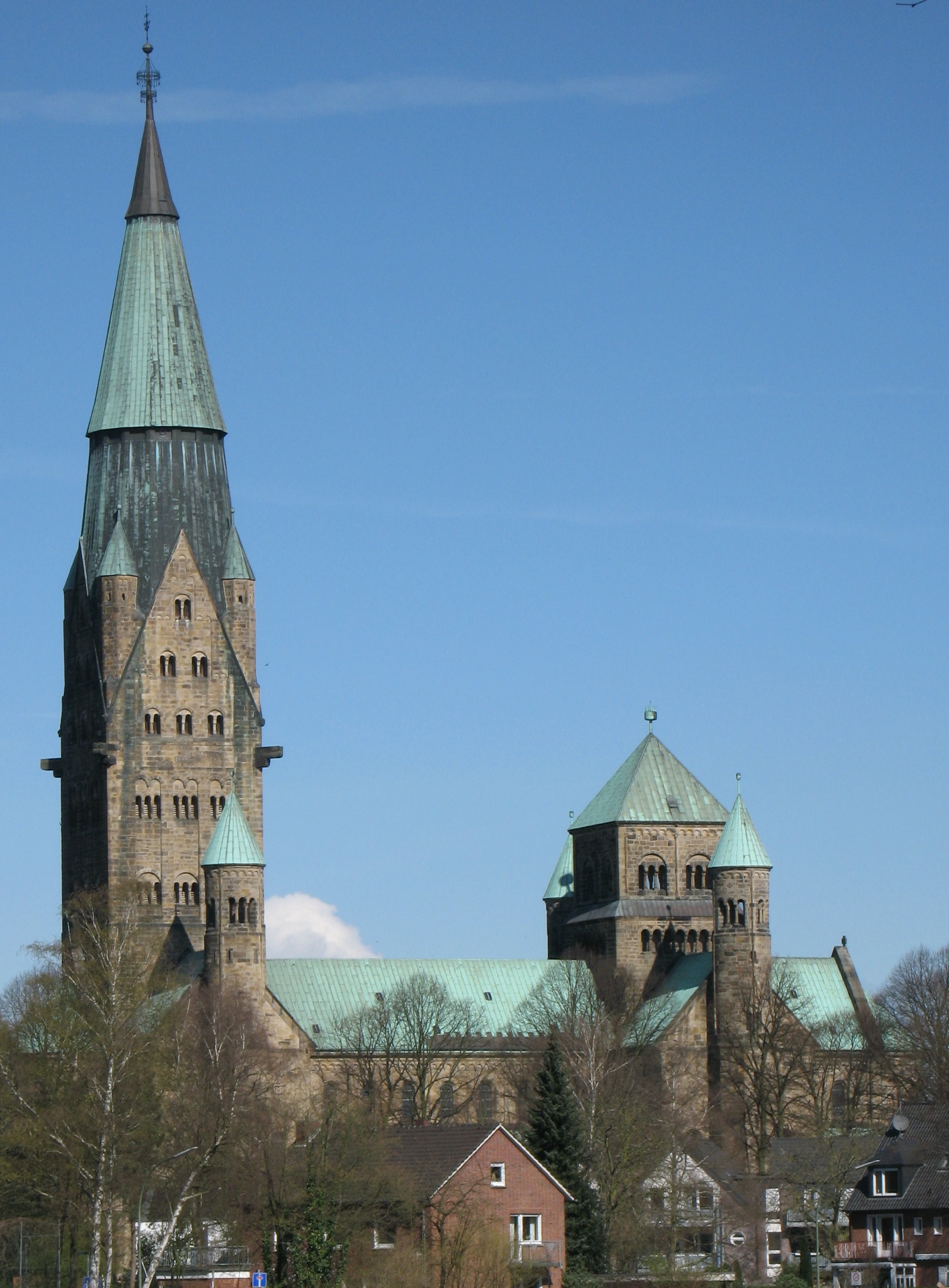

St. Anthony's Basilica is a neo-Romanesque church building in Rheine - Eschendorf. The church was built between 1899 and 1905 in the style of a Romanesque imperial cathedral and dedicated to Saint Anthony of Padua. It lies to the right of the Ems on Osnabrücker Straße and is the parish church of the Catholic parish of St. Antonius (also called the parish on the right of the Ems ) in Rheine. With 650 seats, a total length of 90 meters and a maximum width of 39 meters, the representative building is the largest church in the city and dominates the image of the district with its imposing dimensions. The St. Antonius Basilica is considered to be one of the most elaborate and important church buildings of late historicism in Germany.

== Building Specification ==
St. Antonius is a three-aisled basilica with a retracted, wooden flat ceiling, an east and a west transept, two crossing towers, four flank towers and two choirs. With the two side aisles and the main aisle windows in the clerestory, it meets the architectural requirements for classification as a basilica. It is the work of the German-Dutch architect Franz Klomp.

The architect was largely based on the Hildesheim churches of St. Michael from the 11th century and St. Godehard from the 12th century. The west tower was designed based on the tower of Paderborn Cathedral. With a height of 102.5 meters, it is the highest church tower in the Münsterland and thus towers over the towers of St. Lamberti in Münster (90.5 meters), St. Nicomedes in Borghorst (99 meters) and the Propsteikirche St. Ludgerus in Billerbeck (100 meters). At the four corners of the crossing towerthere are plastic representations of figures from Rheinenser history: Charlemagne, Bishop Ludwig II, Bishop Christoph Bernhard Graf von Galen and Johannes von Grüter, Gograf in Rheine.

The richly ornamented portal hall is in front of the west choir; down to the last detail it resembles medieval portal structures with the function of a place of law. In contrast to the imperial cathedrals, the west choir does not appear inside the basilica. It houses the baptismal Antonius chapel in the north and the sacristy in the south.

== Amenities ==
The predominantly white space is structured by the alternating red and gray arches between the parts of the room and above the columns. In the east choir, which is surrounded by an ambulatory, is the high altar, created between 1925 and 1929 in the workshop of Ferdinand Langenberg (Goch) based on a design by Joseph Windhosen. It is crowned with the image of the Crucified, in the altarpiece underneath four other biblical scenes from the Passion to the Pentecost event. The central altar represents the mercy seat (God the Father, Son and the Holy Spirit). Despite post-Vatican II considerations, as in many other churches, to remove the high altar from its place and place the pictorial panels elsewhere in the church, it remained in place due to protests from the community.

The location of the side altars is a bit strange; the altar of Mary stands on the eastern end of the southern aisle, which was traditionally reserved for men. Accordingly, on the opposite side in the northern aisle (i.e. the original women's aisle ) is the rest of the Joseph altar. Another eye-catcher in the choir (and almost the only figural decoration on the walls of the church interior) is the image of Christ the King in the apse. Originally planned as a mosaic, a painting by the artist Peter Hecker was made for cost reasonscreated from Cologne. However, he added some pieces of the jigsaw puzzle to his picture. In contrast to the outside, sculptural building decorations can only be found very sporadically in the interior, e.g. B. in the form of angel representations in the spandrels of the choir arches.

Particularly worth mentioning are the crypts under the choir (modeled after Roman catacombs), designed by Friedrich Stummel, and the baptistery in the west choir, painted by Karl Wenzel, a student of Stummel. In addition to a large room for services, the crypt also houses the Basilica Museum with a large collection of old liturgical utensils and textiles as well as devotional objects, Furthermore, a large number of documents on the building history of the church. The tomb of the builder of the basilica, Dean Bernhard Pietz (1840–1915), can also be found here, which was secretly prepared (against his will) by the builders in honor of the priest in "his" basilica here. The baptistery houses a baptismal font resting on eight spherical feet and eight semicircular arches. It is richly carved in relief and covered with a Byzantine bronze dome with eight corner towers. The pool was created in 1920 based on a design by the architect Josef Franke.

The construction of the basilica, with its cathedral-like dimensions, reflects the structural change that took place in northern Münsterland at the end of the 19th century, when large industrial companies were established in the region, which was once dominated by agriculture, and the old parish church of St. Dionysius was no longer sufficient. The motto of the builder, Dean Bernhard Pietz, has been handed down: "High the chimneys - higher the church towers!" According to his idea, the church tower should be at least twice as high as the surrounding chimneys of the textile factories.

== Bells ==
After its consecration, the church had to wait another 15 years for a bell that was appropriate to the size of the church. As a first provisional arrangement, the congregation received a loan of three small bronze bells from the Petit & Edelbrock bell foundry in Gescher in the year of consecration in 1904 . This bell was hung (just as provisionally) in the stump of the still unfinished tower. In 1919, 7 large bells were delivered, designed by the bell founder Heinrich Humpert from Brilon in Sauerland, manufactured by the Buderus iron foundry in Wetzlar.

The foundry mentioned already suggests a special feature: this ringing (like the tower with its height, which is unique in the region) is an exception in the region, as all seven bells are made of steel and, for reasons of cost, not like in most other places of worship in the region Münsterland, made of bell bronze . The bell clapper is made of bronze to allow a pleasant and full sound. The bells with the names Aloysius, Agnes, Maria, Antonius, Franziskus Heinrich and Georg Franz-August are largely named after their donors, mostly members of the city's wealthy textile dynasties. Through the turmoil of the First World Warthe bells were not officially consecrated until 1921. The ringing is impressively powerful, full and homogeneous thanks to the unusual combination of materials made of steel and bronze. The expected sharp sound of the steel was offset by a particularly pure tone tuning.

During the Second World War, the bells were confiscated in many places and melted down for weapons production. This had already happened to two of the three bronze bells of the provisional bells during the First World War. Bell bronze was good for use in the armaments industry, but steel was not. Thus the bells of the basilica remained in the tower. However, the anecdote that the tower was too high for the National Socialists to remove the bell and therefore the bells were not rung belongs to the realm of legends. The bells are the only completely preserved original bells from before the Second World War in Rheine.

== Organ ==
In 1906 the church received a small organ on loan from the organ building company Anton Feith, which was set up on the ground floor in the ambulatory. The first large organ, an instrument built by the Eggert & Feith organ builders (Paderborn) in 1908, had 44 registers. Due to the acoustically unfavorable position high up on the west gallery, it did not have a prospectus, which would only have further dampened the sound.

In 1969 this organ was electrified by the Kreienbrink company from Osnabrück, a new console was installed and the front was redesigned. Furthermore, almost half of the registers were replaced. Ten years later, an expert opinion revealed that further repairs to the organ were not worthwhile. After an invitation to tender for a new instrument, the organ builder G. Christian Lobback (Neuendeich) was commissioned with the new building.

This new organ was completed in 1984 and, like its predecessor, was installed in the west gallery. The instrument has 54 registers and loop windchests. The key action is mechanical, the stop action is electric.

== Nativity ==
The basilica's large Christmas crib, which has been set up in the crypt every year since 1981 and can be visited from December 24 ( Christmas Eve ) to the end of January, has gained national fame. In several scenes with more than one hundred figures, the crib not only depicts the birth of Christ, but also e.g. B. also the Annunciation of the Angel to Mary, St. John as a caller in the desert, the Three Wise Men on their journey to Bethlehemand many other side scenes. This happens partly with historical figures from the 19th century, staged with wide views, artificial rock formations and some sheep that can be petted. A reference to the crucifixion of Jesus is always part of the crib. A team of several employees starts at the beginning of November every year with the preparations such as care and repair of the figures in order to be able to offer visitors an extensive "nativity scene" just in time for Christmas. Guided tours are offered for interested groups, especially children, and are very popular. It is always pointed out that the makers of the nativity scene are not just concerned with the folkloreaspects of the Christmas story, but also about a well-founded and clear way of preaching the gospel. In 2020, for the first time in 39 years, the crèche had to be set up due to hygiene regulations in the wake of the COVID-19 epidemic.
