= Folk revival (disambiguation) =

Folk revival may refer to:

- American folk music revival
- British folk revival
- Roots revival
- Roots Revival (project)
