= Săpânța-Peri Monastery =

Coordinates: 47.9794°N 23.6971°E

Church of Archangel Michael
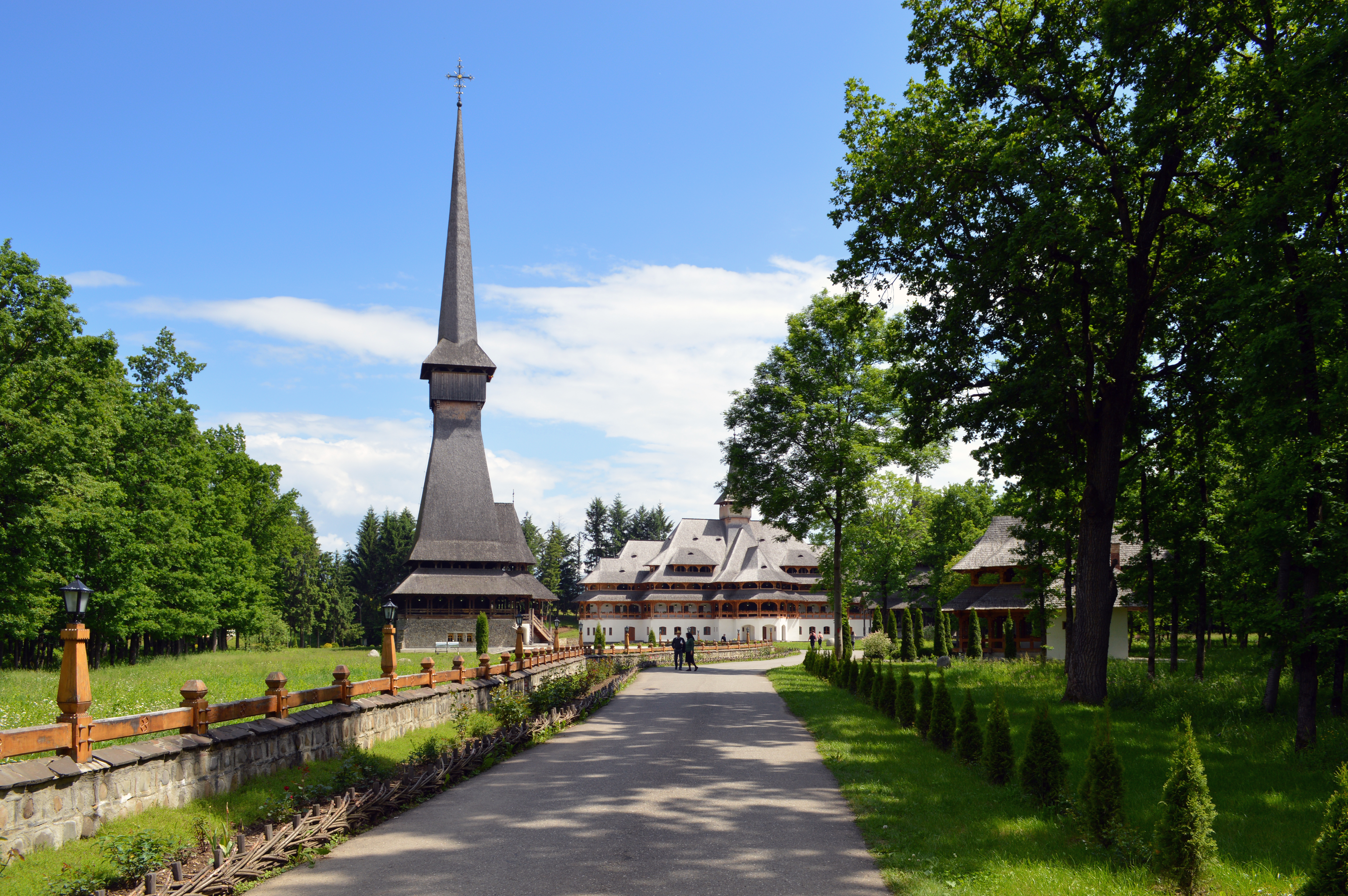
- Wooden church of Săpânța-Peri
- Click the map for an interactive, fullscreen view
- Location: Săpânța, Maramureș County
- Country: Romania
- Denomination: Eastern Orthodox

Architecture
- Completed: 1997

Specifications
- Height: 78 m

The church of Archangel Michael in Săpânța-Peri from the village of Săpânța in the region of Maramureș, Romania is the tallest wooden church in the world. A representative of the characteristic Wooden Churches of Maramureș with double eaves, the church continues the tradition of the old Orthodox monastery in Peri, the ruins of which are now found in the area of Hrushove in Ukraine.

== History ==
=== Original church ===
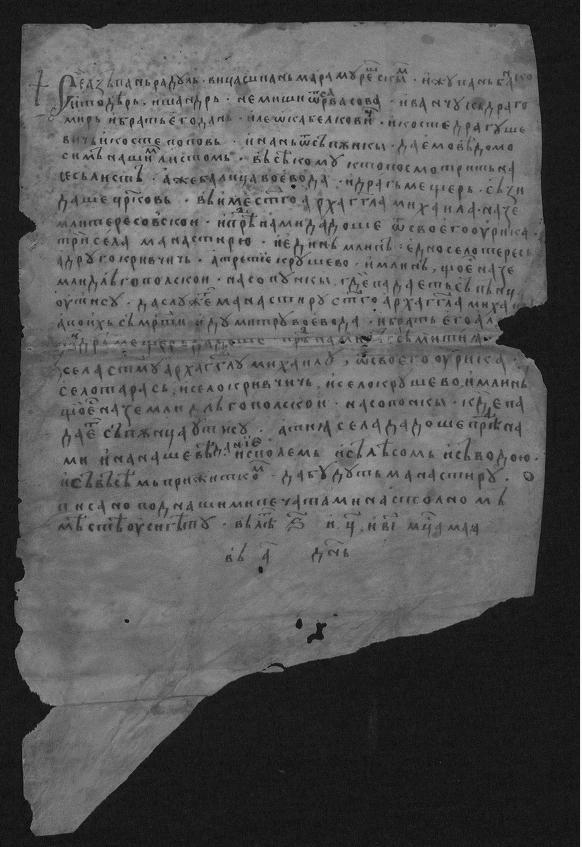
Slavonic document about the Peri monastery dated 1 May 1404 in Sighet (National Archives of Hungary, DL 42811).

In 1391, the grandsons of Dragoș of Moldavia donated lands and goods to the Peri Monastery, and a stone church was built. For more than 300 years, this stone church was used as the headquarters of the Romanian Diocese of Maramureș, being later built by the craftsman Ioan Macarie a place to serve as a place of prayer for the Greek-Catholic community in the surroundings. During the time of the Dragoșești voivodes, the monastery was patronized by Saint Michael the Archangel. At the Peri Monastery, "The Psalter", "The Gospel", "The Sunday Legend", "The Voroțean Codex" and "The Acts of the Apostles" were translated and copied into Romanian for the first time. In 1404, a number of Romanian nobles reinforced the possession of the Monastery, mentioning the previous donation of Balc and Drag: three villages (Taras, Criva and Peri) and a mill "in the land of Câmpulung on the Săpânța river, where Săpânța flows into the Tisza, and after their death, Dumitru voivode and his brother Alexandru."

Nowadays, the church's charter quotes the following: "The craftsmen strengthened these dominions in front of the monastery". Historical events led to the destruction of the original monastery church in the year 1783.

=== Rebuilt monastery ===
The Săpânța-Peri Monastery was founded in 1997, within the boundaries of the village of Săpânța, out of the desire to renew the historical tradition of the old Monastery of the Holy Archangel Michael, from Peri, Maramureș. Founded by the parish priest Grigore Lutai, according to the plans of the architect Dorel Cordoș, the Săpânța Peri Monastery received, from 2005, a community of nuns, which continued the construction work started previously. The Maramureş style church of the monastery was originally plated with 8.5 kilograms of gold, and the cross, seven meters high, in turn, covered with four kilograms of gold. The construction is located on the banks of the Tisza and was built between 1998 and 2003. The tower of the monastery is visible from a distance of five kilometers over the Tisza river and can be admired by Romanians from Transcarpathia, a region of historical Maramureș which is nowadays part of modern Ukraine. Currently, the monastery hosts 6 nuns, the abbess being Stavrofora Agnia Ciuban.

With a maximum height of 78 m, the church of the Săpânța-Peri monastery is currently ranked third among other tall places of worship in Romania by pinnacle height, after the Timișoara Orthodox Cathedral and the Roman Catholic church of Sf. Mihail in Cluj, and before other imposing wall edifices, such as the evangelical churches in Bistrița or Sibiu.

== Gallery ==
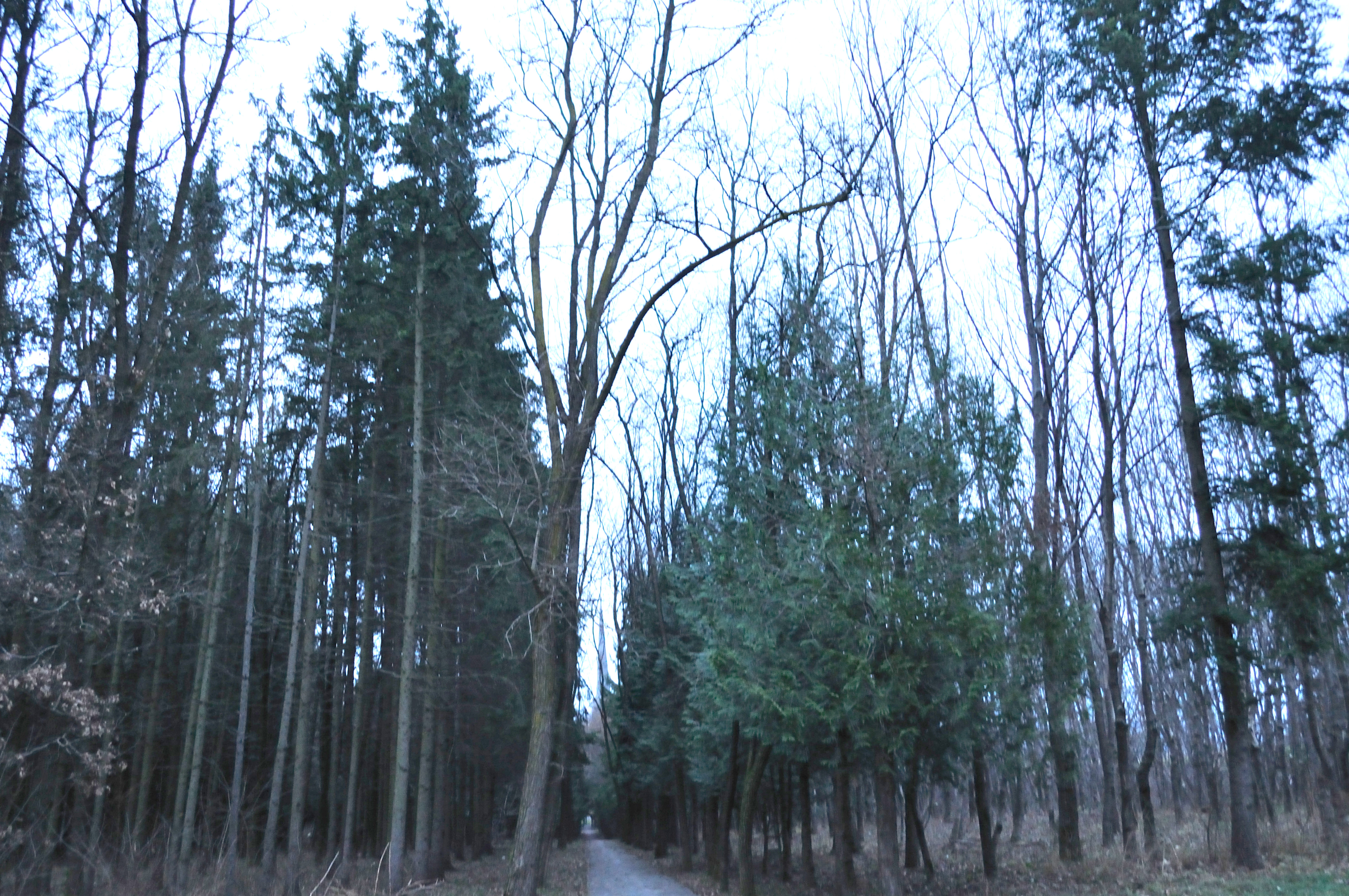
The dendrological park of „Livada”

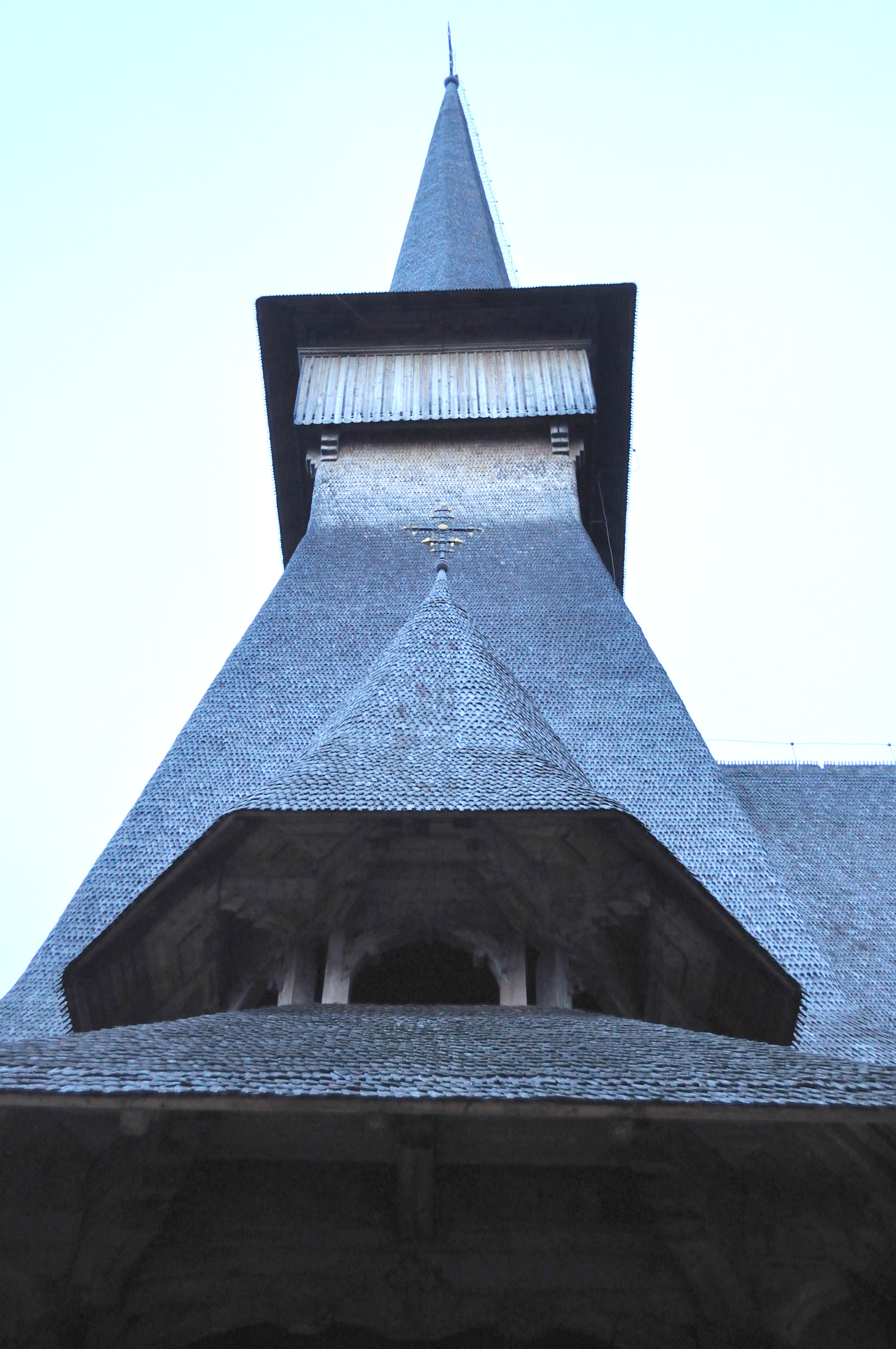
The tower

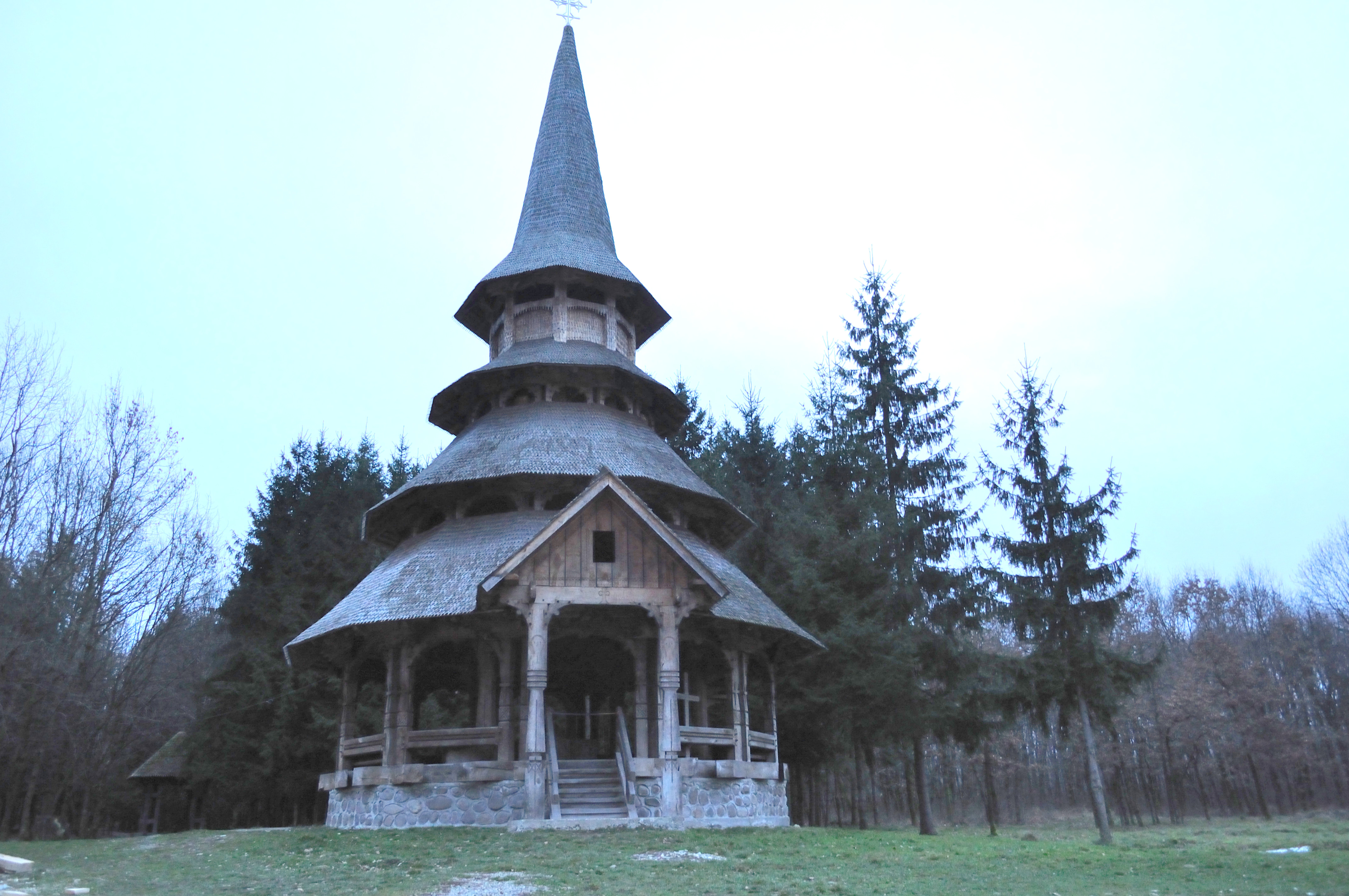
The summer altar

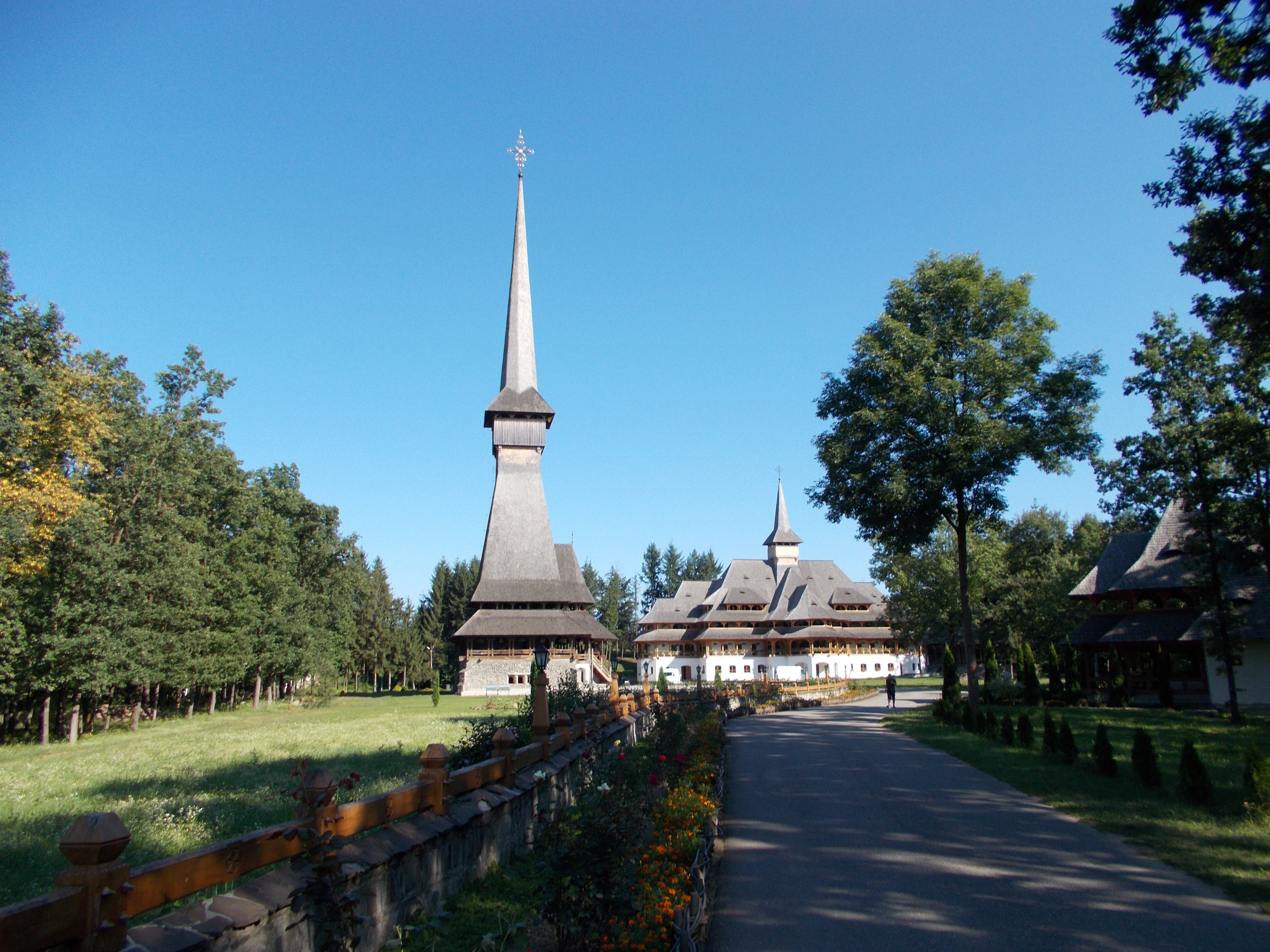
Overview
