= Roots Revival (project) =

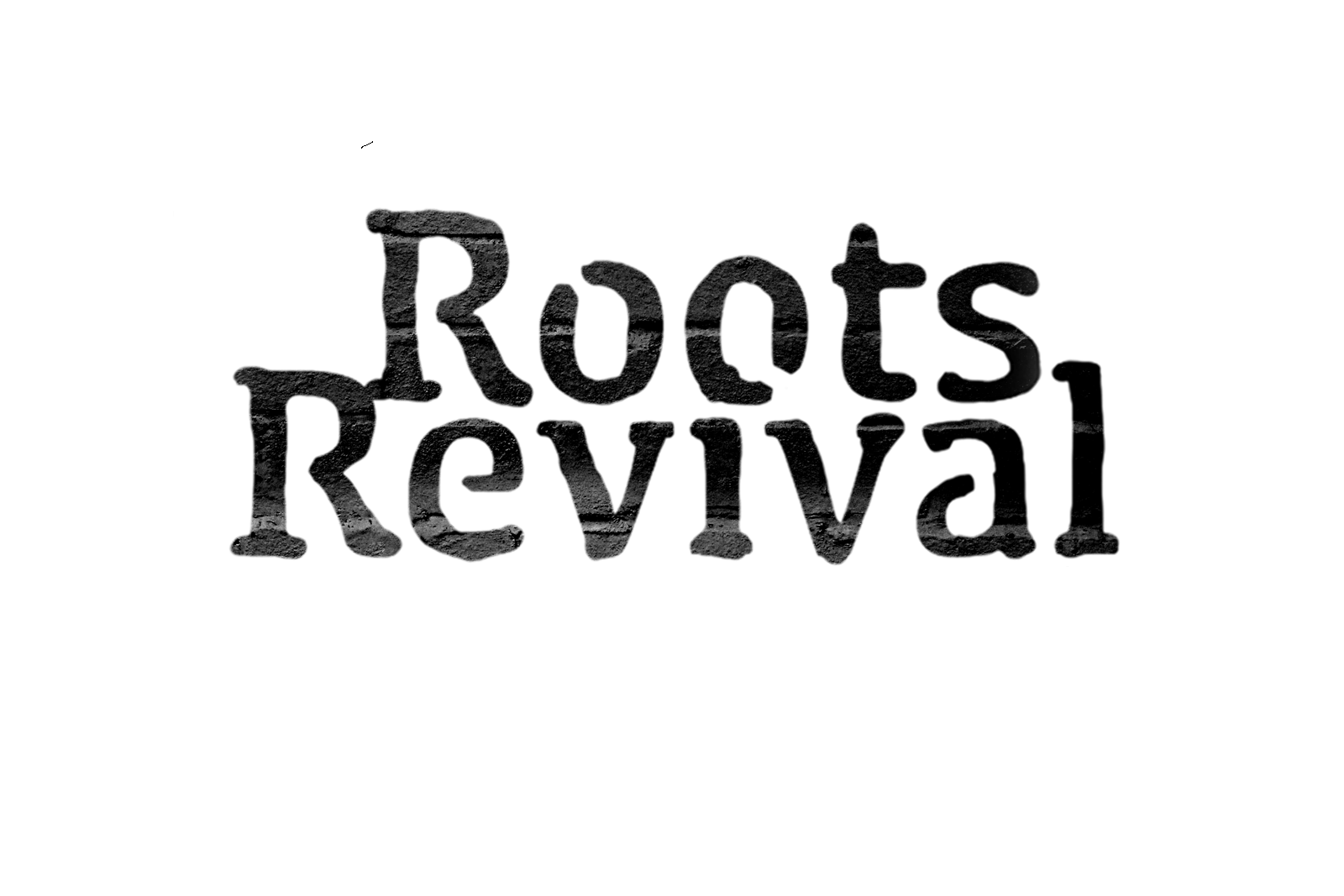

Background information
- Genres: Music and cultural project
- Years active: Since 2013
- Website: roots-revival.com

Roots Revival is an international cultural project which reunites professional musicians from different countries in an effort to connect the musical styles, traditions and instruments that are specific to each geographical area they come from, thus creating a bridge between cultures using authentic music. The concept founded by Mehdi Aminian.

== History ==
The concept started in 2013 at the initiative of Mehdi Aminian, a traditional music researcher who spent most of his adolescence travelling to different continents and studying numerous traditional cultures such as Persian, Balkan, South East Asian, Middle Eastern, Indian and Romanian.

His first contact with Romania was during his performances in various festivals and soon after his first trip to Maramures, he found Romania very inspiring to put all his traveling and research experience into a concept later developed as Roots Revival. After intensive research collecting information about performing artists all around the world, he invited seven professional musicians from seven countries, in order to put together a performance in seven days. With a close collaboration with Peter Hurley, a traditional culture researcher known as Irish man from Romania, the musicians explored the surroundings of Maramures and spent time with local artists getting to know the Romanian rural environment way of life, customs and beliefs. They transposed this experience into music and seven days later they shared their local inspired music with the North-Romanian people in a concert held at the Merry Cemetery in Săpânța. Later on, they brought the project to Bucharest, performing the Maramures experience in Radio Hall gaining popularity in the Romanian cultural scene. The recording of the concert lead to the release of their first live album called Chapter One: Maramures. The focus on this album was on traditional instruments such as ney, oud, duduk, kaval, bodhran, darbouka, and tulnic. The album was highly appreciated by critics especially in the Romanian cultural scene.

The second project called Colors of Maria was inspired by Maria Tanase and it is said to “reignite her spirit in new colors, a fusion of old and new, artistic emotion and virtuosity”. This was an occasion for new collaborations, thus, new names appear on this project's line up. This chapter was the start of collaboration with Walid Abboud, a businessman and a music admirer. His supports and assigning his company Sensiblu as the official sponsor of Roots Revival was the start of series of events. Colors of Maria debuted in February 2014 with a concert held in the Romanian Athenaeum. Similar to the previous album, the second album, Chapter Two: Maria Tanase, was recorded live in the concert held in Radio Hall on March 1, 2014, and gain even more popularity, having critics describing it as “a unique melange of cultures, interpretations and original compositions”.

In 2015 Roots Revival is expanding their understanding upon music, with a new focus on dialogue between cultures. In a press interview, Mehdi Aminian announces two new projects: Doina Revival in collaboration with Maria Casandra Hausi, with an emphasis on Romanian Doina and its allegedly Persian origins, and Aramaic & Sufi in collaboration with Abeer Nehme, a project that brings together new musicians belonging to different cultures – “Aramaic is the language of Jesus and spiritual musical culture in Christianity and Sufi is the inner mystical dimension of Islam, very connected to poetry and music. Bringing these two branches of spirituality together is more than an experiment, is a project that tries to promote dialogue and peace between different cultures.”

In 2016 Mehdi has announced Call of the winds which is trying to demonstrate common musical roots of Persia and India through the medium of two wind instruments, the Bansuri (India) and the Ney (Iran).

in 2017 the project Quieter than Silence has been launched which followed by an album launch and tours. “Quieter than Silence” has begun with a story of friendship, beyond stereotypes and political conflicts between an Iranian and a Syrian artist, in Bucharest. Even though this music is rooted in Syrian, Persian and Sufi music cultures, applying various rhythmical and timbrel elements throughout the process, made it a unique artistic repertoire and hard to give to it a particular geographical identity.

== Musicians ==
Roots Revival collaborates with various musicians depending on the context. So far, the project has featured many prominent artists.

- Abeer Nehme: Vocals and musicologist (Lebanon)
- Aimee Farrel Courtney: Bodhran (Ireland)
- Akash Bhatt : Tabla and Percussion (India)
- Aleix Tobias Sabater: Percussion (Spain)
- Alexandru Arcus: Saxophone, Kaval (Moldova)
- Behnam Masoumi: Tombak (Iran)
- Emmanuel Hovhannisyan : Duduk (Armenia)
- Ghassan Bouz: Percussion (Lebanon)
- Hristina Beleva: Gadulka (Bulgaria)
- Imad Morcos: Qanun (Lebanon)
- Iosua Galev: Piano (Romania)
- Julia Ohrmann: Bansuri (Germany)
- Leïla Soldevila Renault: Double Bass (France)
- Maria Casandra Hausi: Vocals (Romania, Maramures)
- Marti Hosta: Percussion (Spain)
- Meg Rosaleen Hamilton: Violin ( UK)
- Mehdi Aminian: Vocals, Ney and Setar (Iran)
- Mehmet Polat: Oud (Turkey)
- Monica Madas: Vocals (Romania)
- Mohamad Zatari: Oud (Syria)
- Ruven Ruppik : Percussion (Germany)
- Zabih Vahid: Kamanche (Iran)

== Discography ==
Roots Revival
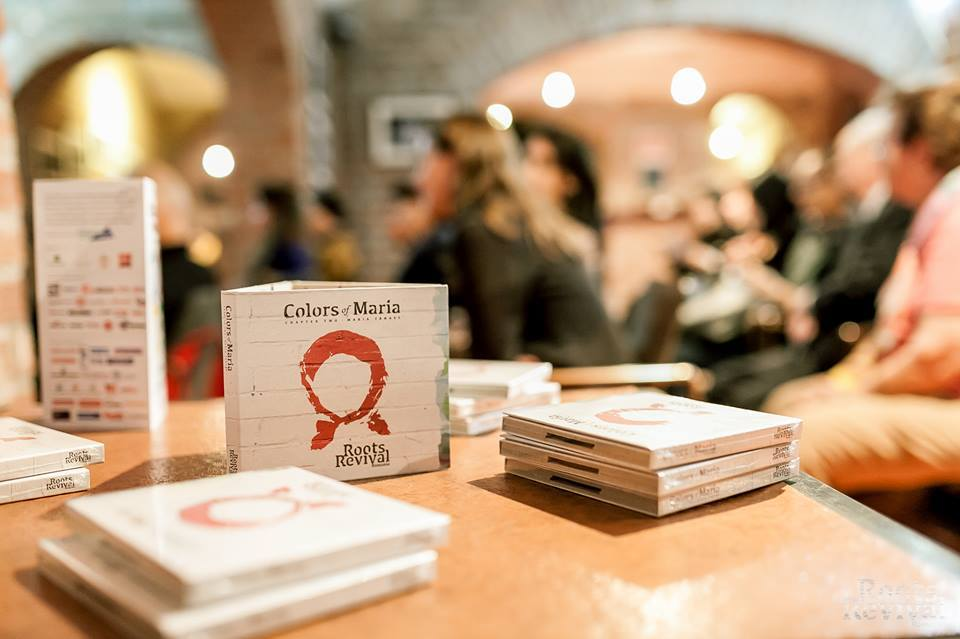

Background information
- Genres: Colors of Maria Tour
- Years active: Since 2013
- Website: http://roots-revival.com/

Album title	Release date	Production
Chapter One: Maramures	February 18, 2014	Quartz Media; Sensiblu
Colors of Maria, Chapter Two: Maria Tanase	September 2, 2014	Mehdi Aminian; Twin Arts; Sensiblu
Quieter than Silence	November 11, 2017	Mehdi Aminian

== Rehearsals (documentary) ==
In 2014, Romanian director Ana Maria Vijdea made a documentary about Roots Revival, capturing how the artists who did not know each other until then were brought together by music in the process of creating the concept Colors of Maria “Without knowing each other in advance, seven musicians from around the world spend time together, improvising and composing, in order to create a homogenous musical act and this film is a intimate portrait of that effort. Their starting point closes on the discography of Maria Tănase, a Romanian folk singer from the 20th century and a major cultural icon.” The director followed them for two months, assisting them in the rehearsals for their first tour. The documentary was selected in multiple film festivals, having its world premiere at Kraków Film Festival, in the DocFilmMusic competition.
