= Stan Ioan Pătraș =

Romanian wood sculptor (1908–1977)

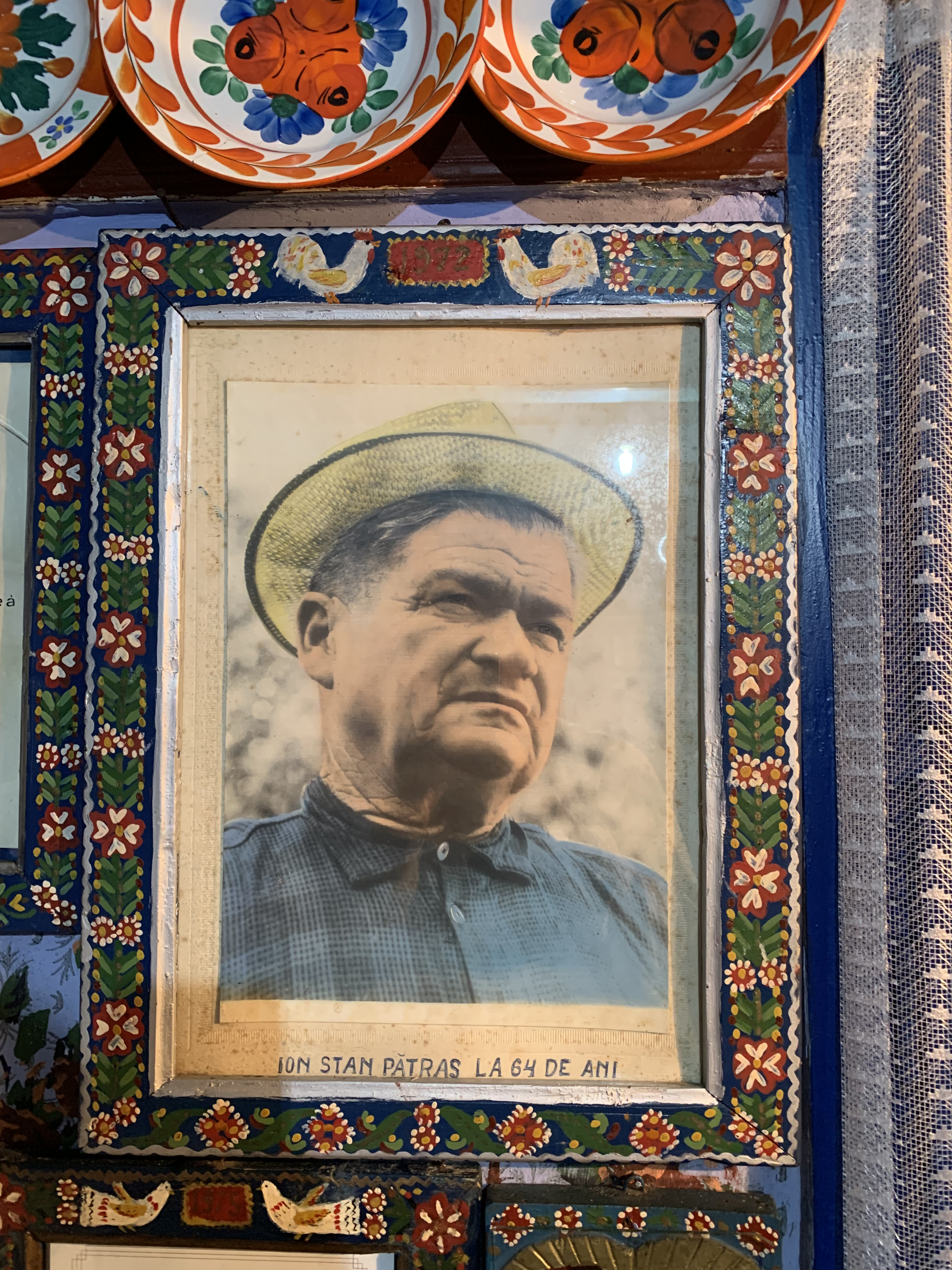
Portrait of Stan Ioan Pătraș at his memorial home museum in Săpânța

Stan Ioan Pătraș (1908–1977) was a Romanian wood sculptor, the creator of the tombstones in the Merry Cemetery in Săpânța, Maramureș County. His creations fit harmoniously within the local popular arts and in the old Romanian tradition.

== Biography ==
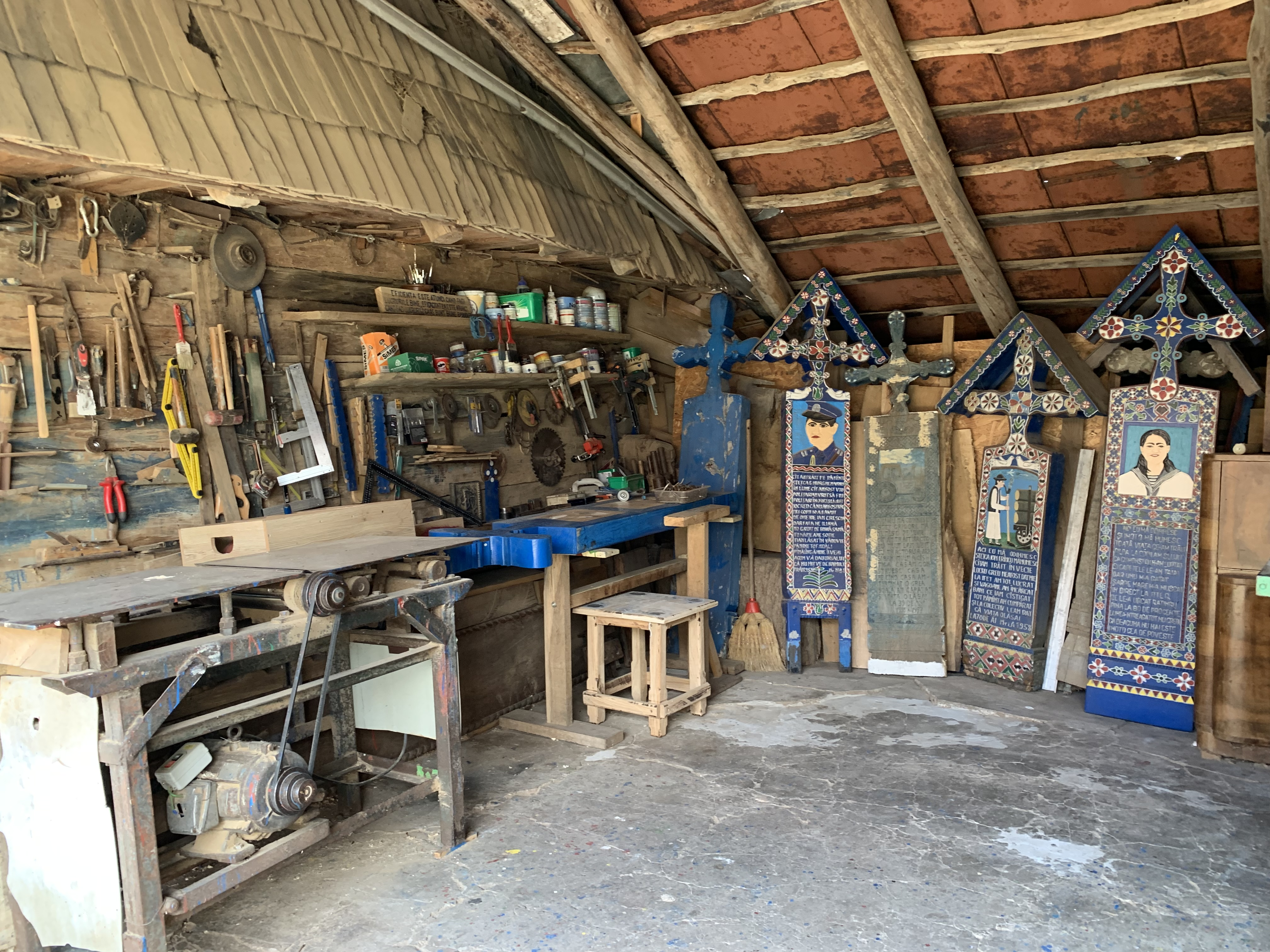
The workshop at Stan Ioan Pătraș's house where the tombstones of Merry Cemetery were created

Stan Ioan Pătraș was born in 1908 in Săpânța commune, Maramureș County (then in Austria-Hungary) in a family that had a long tradition in wood sculpting. Even from his youth he was attracted to sculpture, painting and poetry and at the age of 14 he started to sculpt oak crosses.

In 1935, Pătraș, then an anonymous sculptor, started to carve onto the tombstones small poems written in the first person: ironic poems, with grammatical errors very close to the archaic language the locals spoke. At the beginning he carved only 10 tombstones a year using oak as the base wood.

By 1936 he had already perfected his style: the tombstones became narrower, he started to paint relief figures on them using bright colours obtained from natural pigments. The main colour he used was blue, a special blue named by experts Săpânța blue. The other colours were also symbolic in their unique way: Green – life, Yellow – fertility, Red – passion, Black – death.

Until 1977, Pătraș made almost 700 tombstones in the two graveyards in Săpânța, later known as the Merry Cemetery. He was a versatile folk craftsman, making a series of artistically crafted objects: coat hangers, corner pieces, chairs, cabinets, bowls, spoons, and monumental works, such as crosses and gates. He also decorated his own home with brightly colored wooden sculptures.

He died in 1977, leaving his house to a disciple, Dumitru Pop, who chose to live in his master's house, and later turned it into a workshop and a museum.
