= Merry Cemetery =

Cemetery in Romania

Coordinates: 47°58′17″N 23°41′44″E

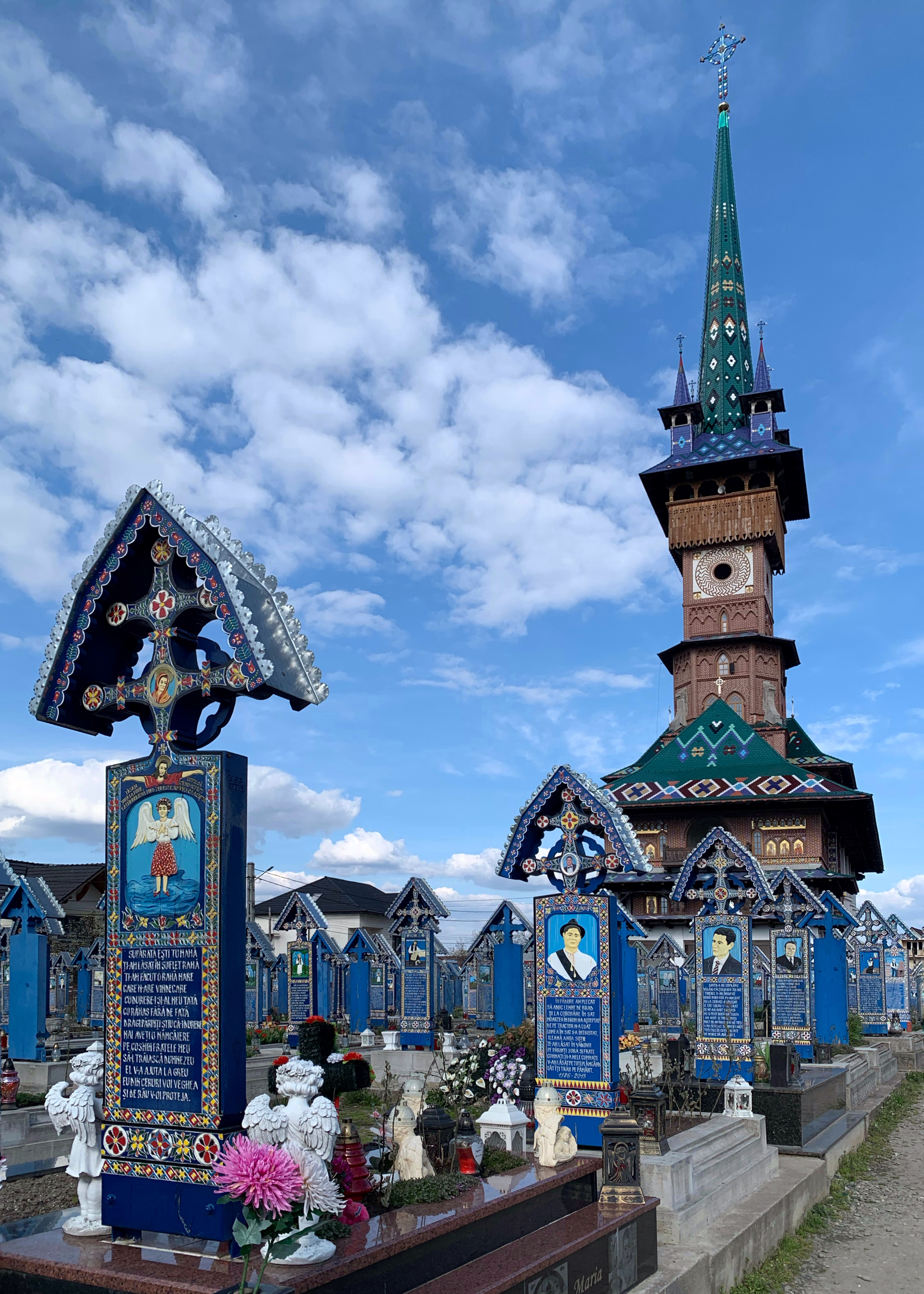
Merry Cemetery and its church

Merry Cemetery (video)

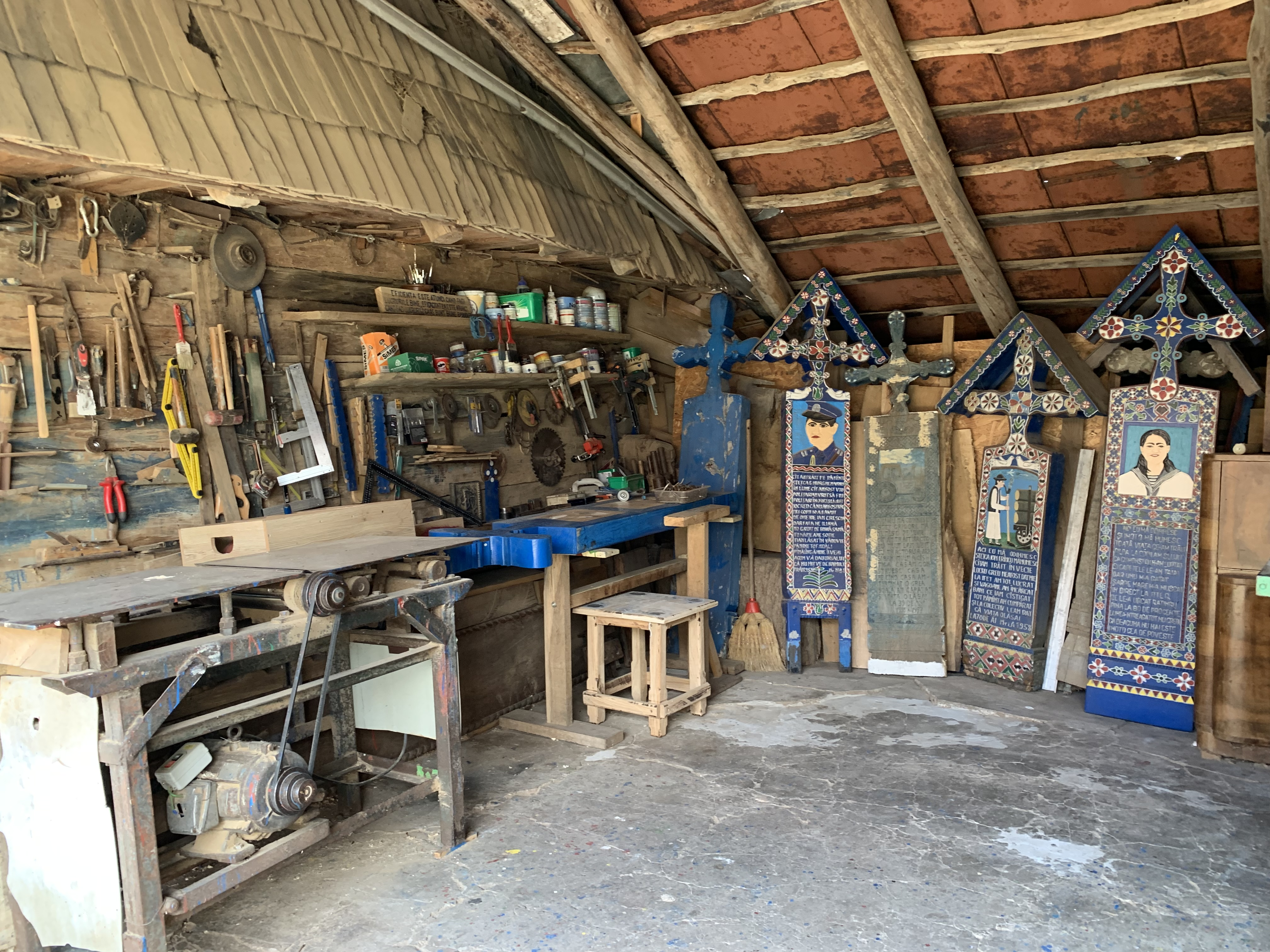
The workshop at Stan Ioan Pătraș's house where the tombstones of Merry Cemetery were created

The Merry Cemetery (Romanian: Cimitirul Vesel pronounced [tʃimiˈtirul ˈvesel], Hungarian: Vidám temető) is a cemetery in the village of Săpânța, Maramureș County, Romania. It is famous for its brightly coloured tombstones with naïve paintings describing, in an original and poetic manner, and often with humour, the people who are buried there in addition to scenes from their lives. The Merry Cemetery became an open-air museum and a national tourist attraction. It has been listed as one of the Seven Wonders of Romania by Imperator Travel.

The unusual feature of this cemetery is that it diverges from the prevalent belief, culturally shared within European societies, that views death as something indelibly solemn.

A collection of the epitaphs from the Merry Cemetery exists in a 2017 volume called Crucile de la Săpânța, compiled by author Roxana Mihalcea, as well as in a photography book titled The Merry Cemetery of Sapanta by Peter Kayafas.

== Founder ==
The cemetery's origins are linked with the name of Stan Ioan Pătraș, a local artist who sculpted the first tombstone crosses. In 1935, Pătraș carved the first epitaph and, as of the 1960s, more than 800 of such oak wood crosses came into sight. The inscription on his tombstone cross says:

Romanian

De cu tînăr copilaș
Io am fost Stan Ion Pătraș
Să mă ascultaț oameni buni
Ce voi spune nu-s minciuni

Cîte zile am trăit
Rău la nime n-am dorit
Dar bine cît-am putut
Orișicine mia cerut

Vai săraca lumea mea
Că greu am trăit în ea

English

Since I was a little boy
I was known as Stan Ion Pătraş
Listen to me, good people
There are no lies in what I am going to say

All along my life
I meant no harm to anyone
But did good as much as I could
To anyone who asked

Oh, my poor World
Because It was hard living in it

== Humorous epitaphs ==
The cemetery is noted for featuring a large number of humorous epitaphs that generally poke fun at the interred person in a light-hearted way or reference a general trope about family relations. The following is an example of an epitaph wrote by a man in honour of his mother-in-law:

Romanian:

Sub această cruce grea
Zace biata soacră-mea
Trei zile de mai trăia
Zăceam eu și cetea ea.
Voi care treceți pă aici
Incercați să n-o treziți
Că acasă dacă vine
Iarăi cu gura pă mine
Da așa eu m-oi purta
Că-napoi n-a înturna
Stai aicea dragă soacră-mea

English:

Under this heavy cross
Lies my poor mother-in-law
Three more days should she have lived
I would lie, and she would read (this cross).
You, who here are passing by
Not to wake her up please try
Cause' if she comes back home
She'll scold me more.
But I will surely behave
So she'll not return from grave.
Stay here, my dear mother-in-law!

== Gallery ==
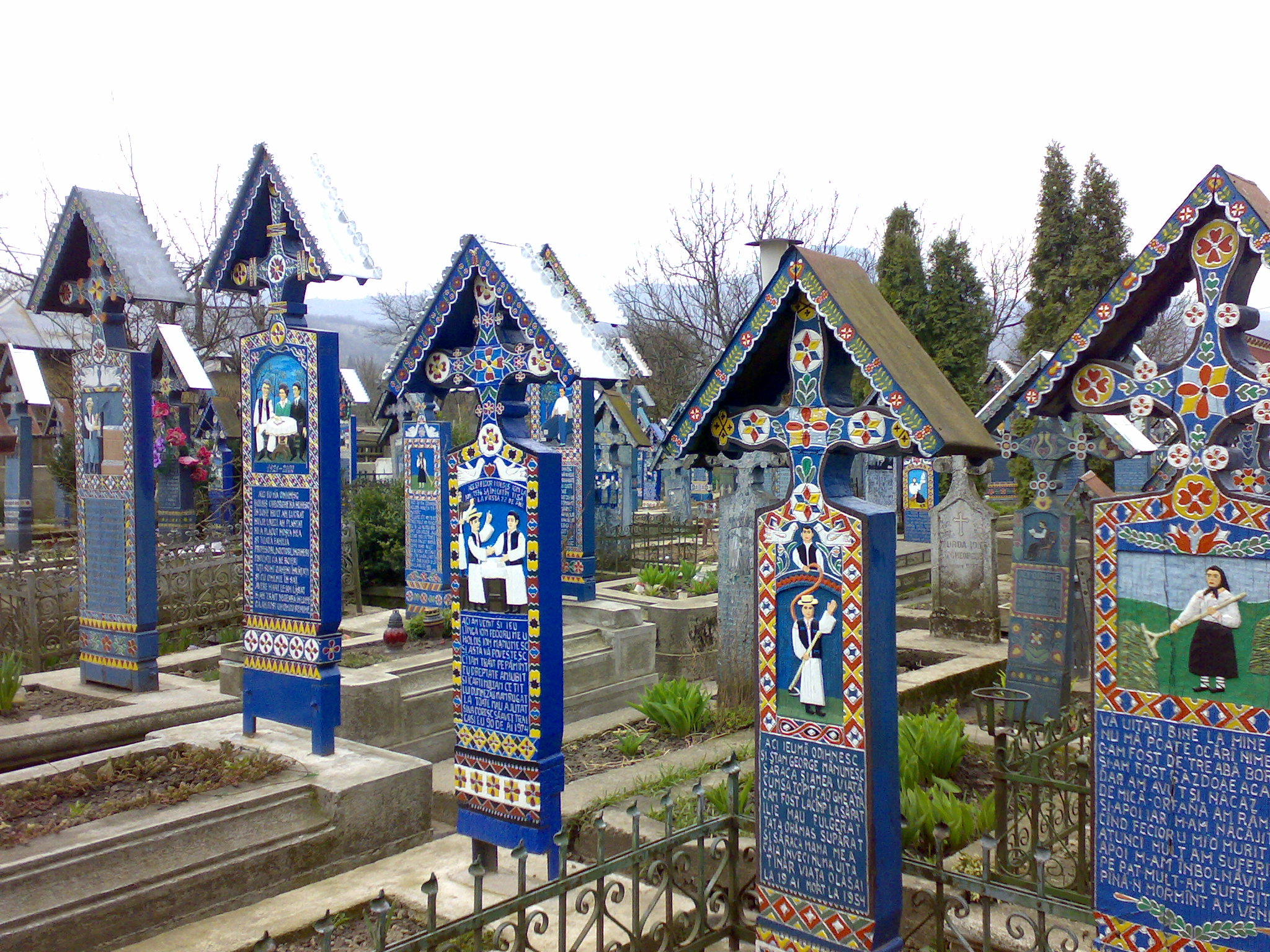
The Merry Cemetery crosses in pale blue color

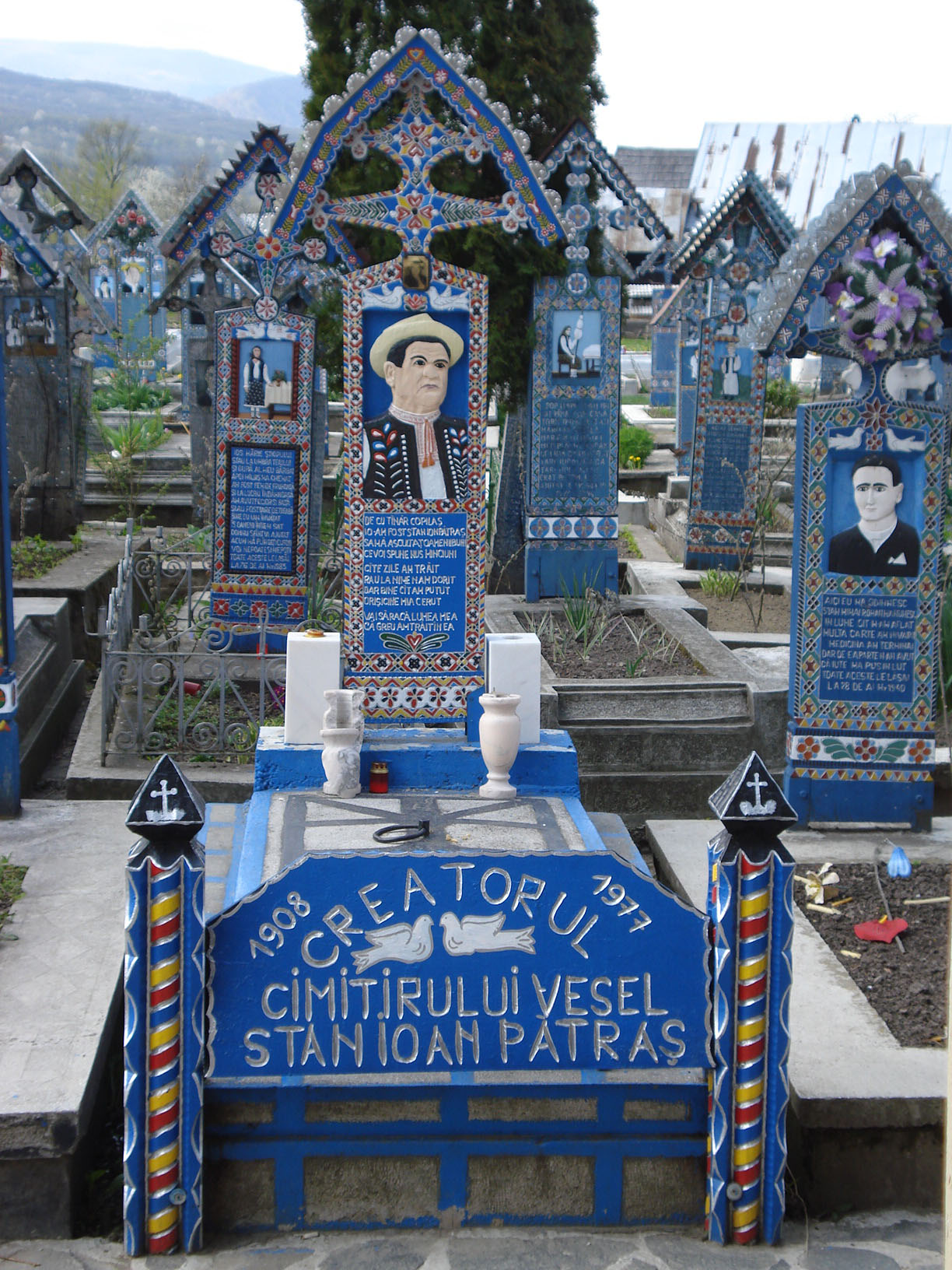
The tombstone of Stan Ioan Pătraş (1908–1977), the creator of Merry Cemetery

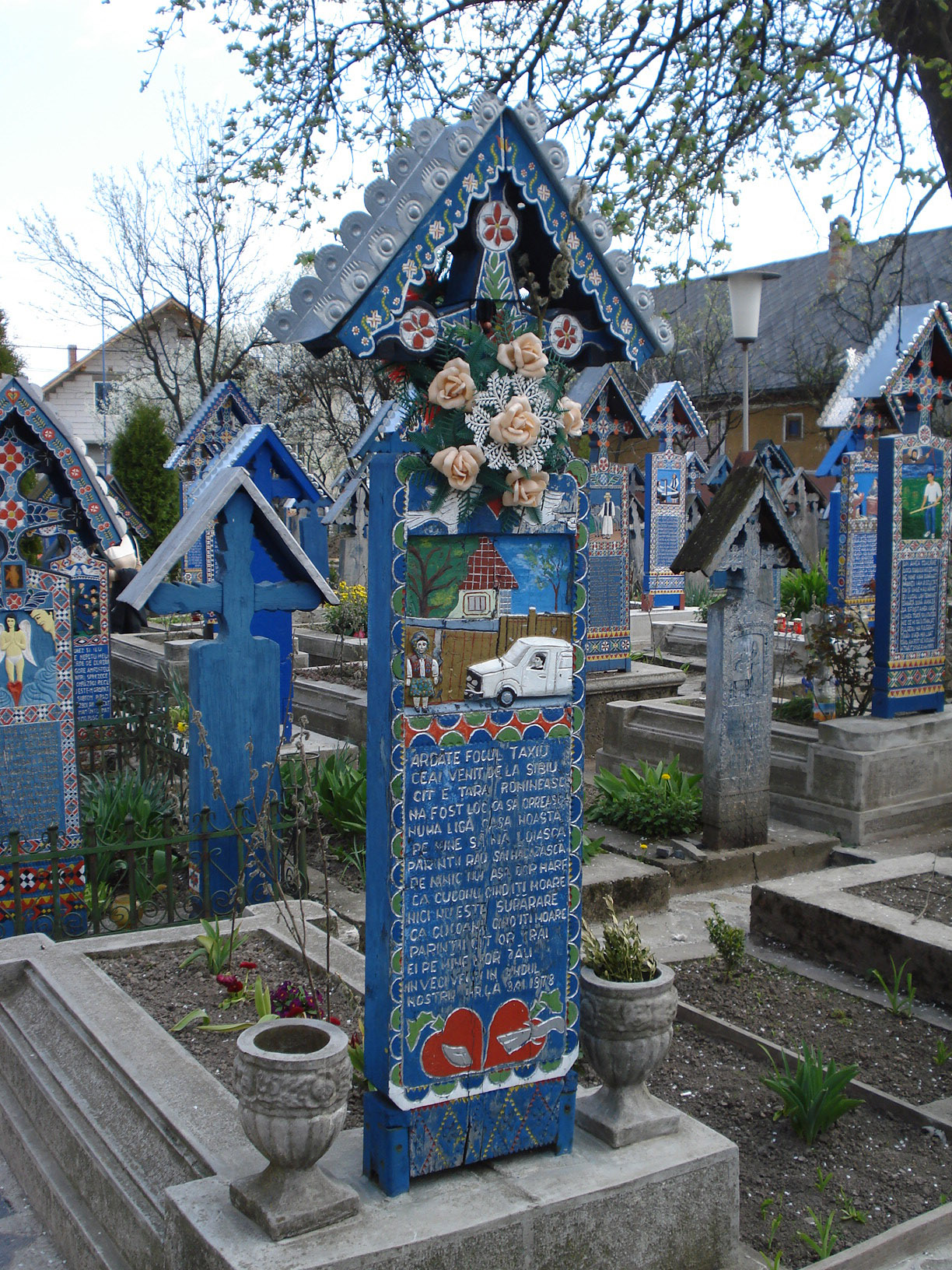
Short description of the life of a villager carved on the cross

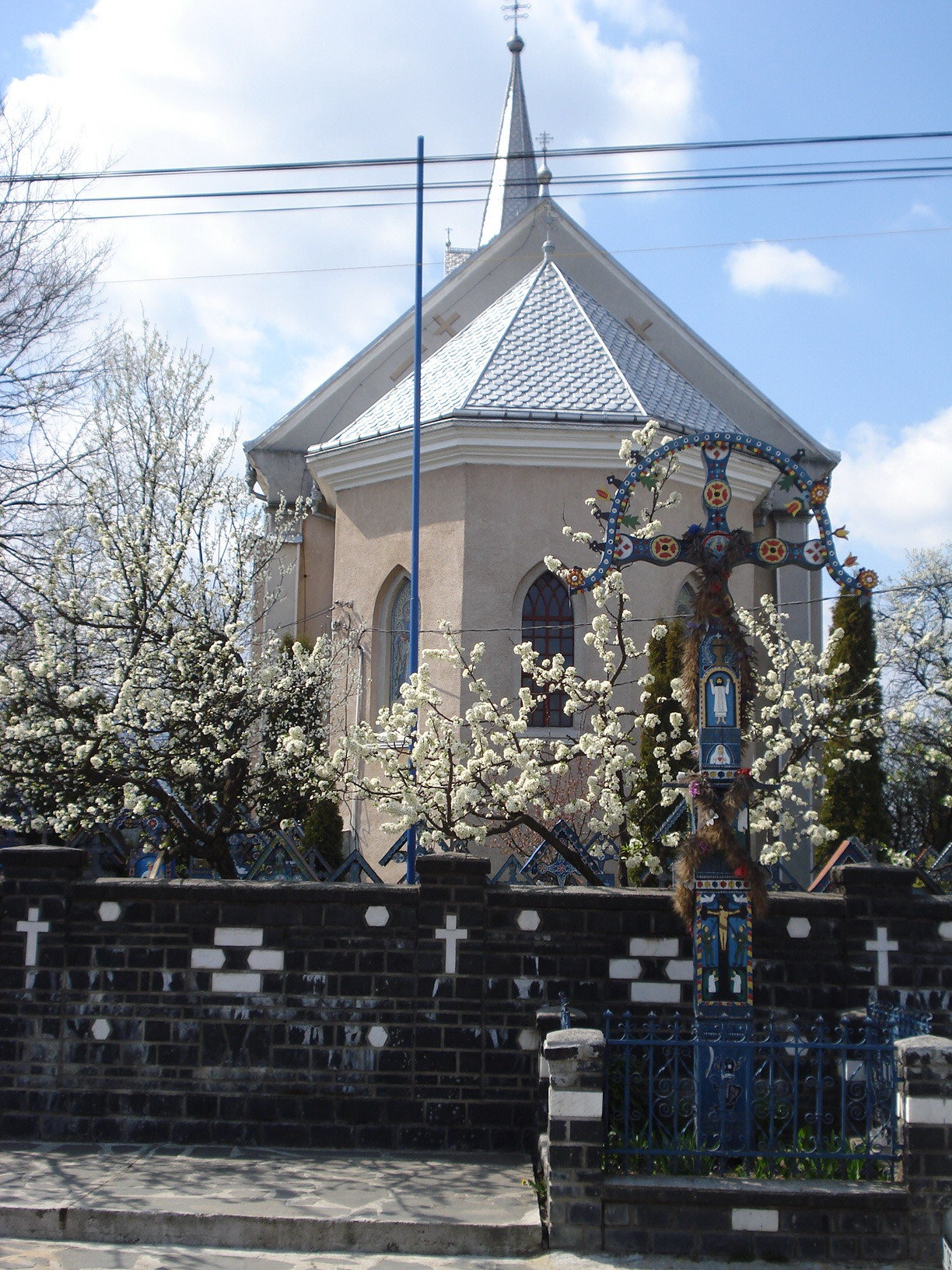
Profile of the Orthodox Church located near the Merry Cemetery

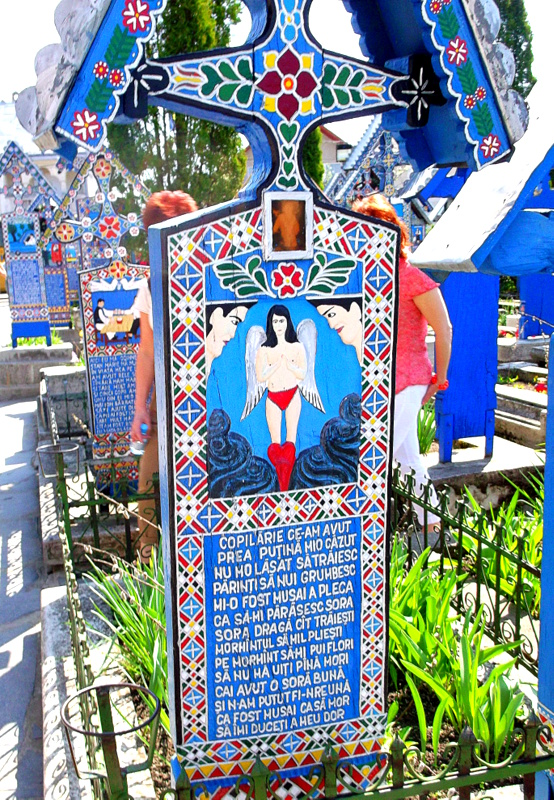

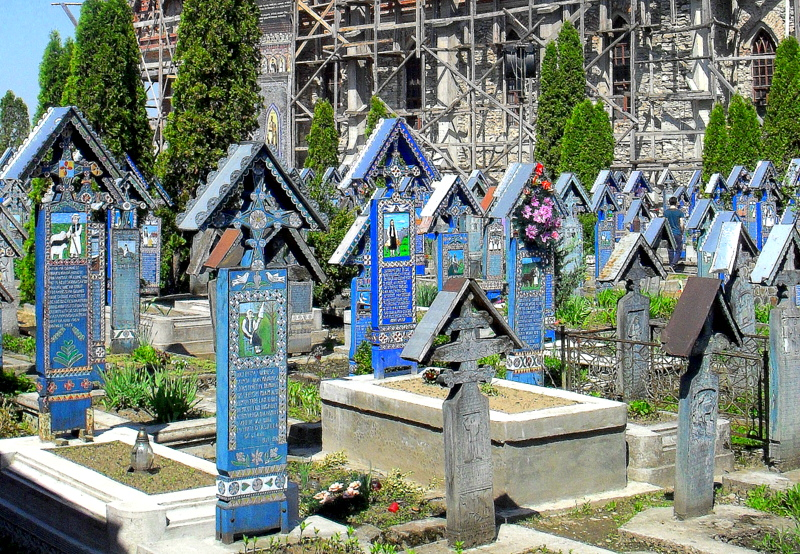

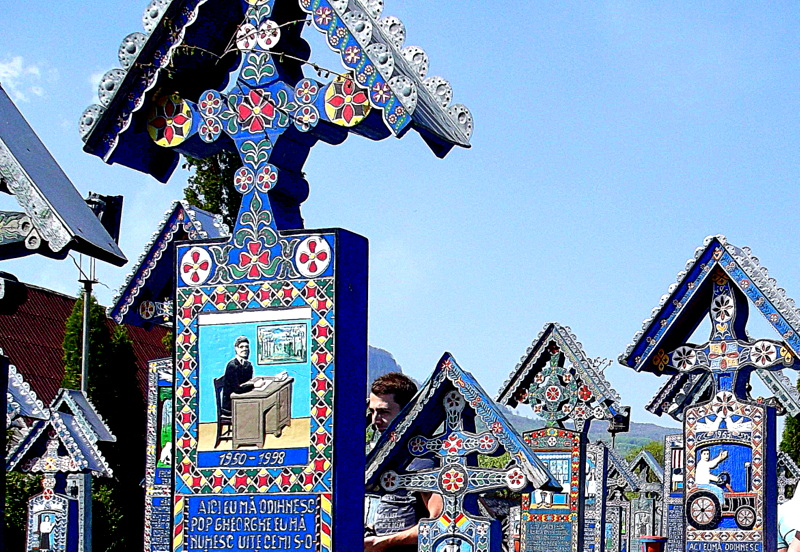

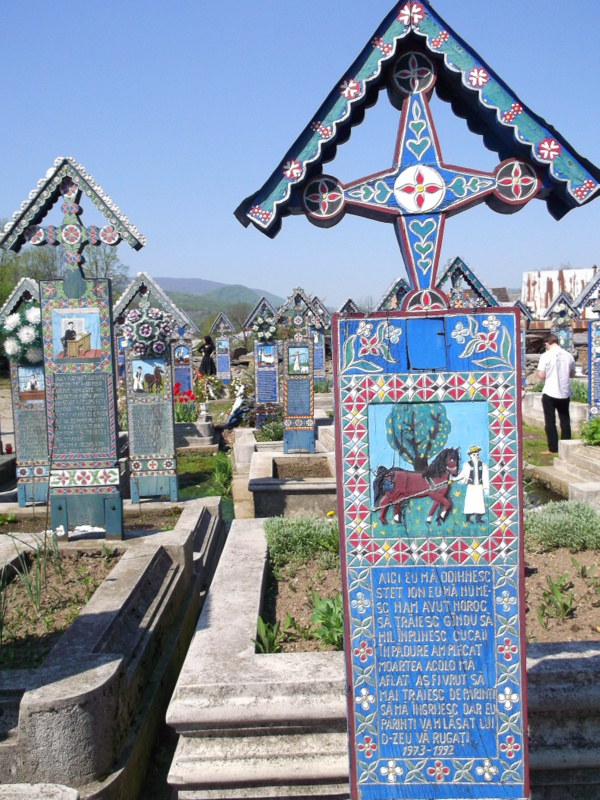

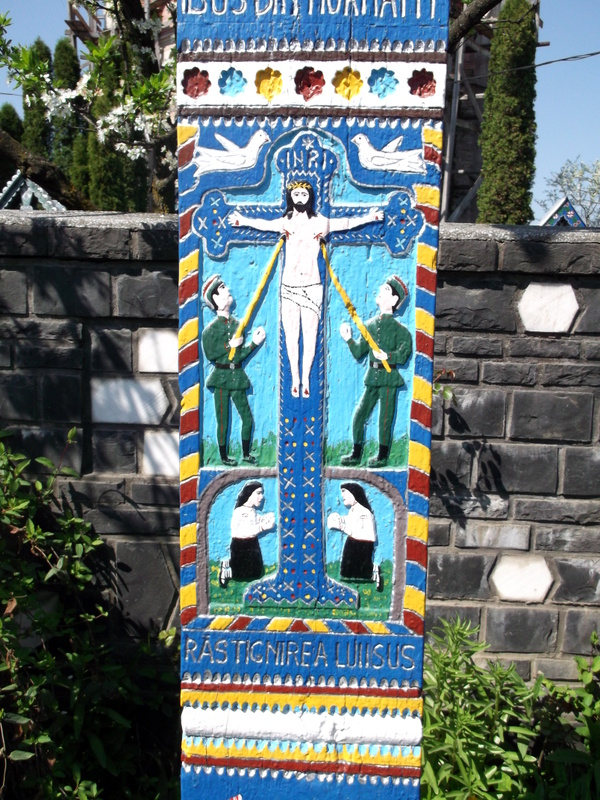

Merry Cemetery crosses

== See also ==
- Tourism in Romania
- Seven Wonders of Romania
