= Săpânța (river) =

River in Romania

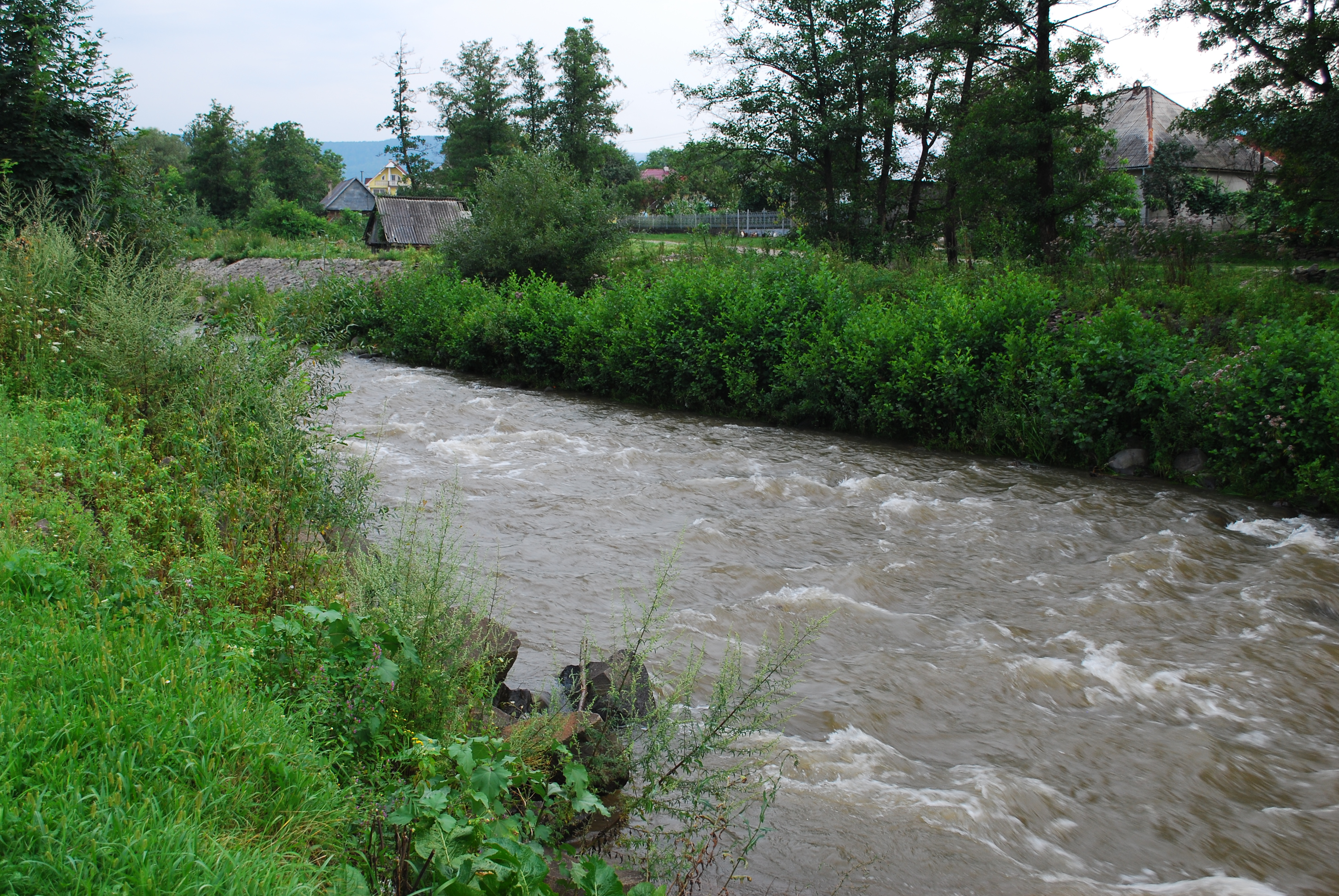

- Location within Romania

Location
- Country: Romania
- Counties: Maramureș County
- Villages: Săpânța

Physical characteristics
- Source: Gutâi Mountains
- Mouth: Tisza
  - location: Săpânța
  - coordinates: 47.9897°N 23.6954°E
- Length: 19 km (12 mi)
- Basin size: 127.4 km^{2} (49.2 mi^{2}) 145 km^{2} (56 mi^{2})
- Discharge
  - location: Near mouth
  - average: (Period: 1971–2000)1.54 m^{3}/s (54 cu ft/s)

Basin features
- Progression: Tisza→ Danube→ Black Sea
- Tributaries
  - left: Nadoșa
  - right: Runc, Belmez

The Săpânța Hungarian: Szaplonca is a left tributary of the river Tisza in Romania. It discharges into the Tisza in the village Săpânța, on the border with Ukraine. Its length is 19 km (12 mi) and its basin size is 145 km^{2} (56 sq mi).
