= Săpânța =

- Commune
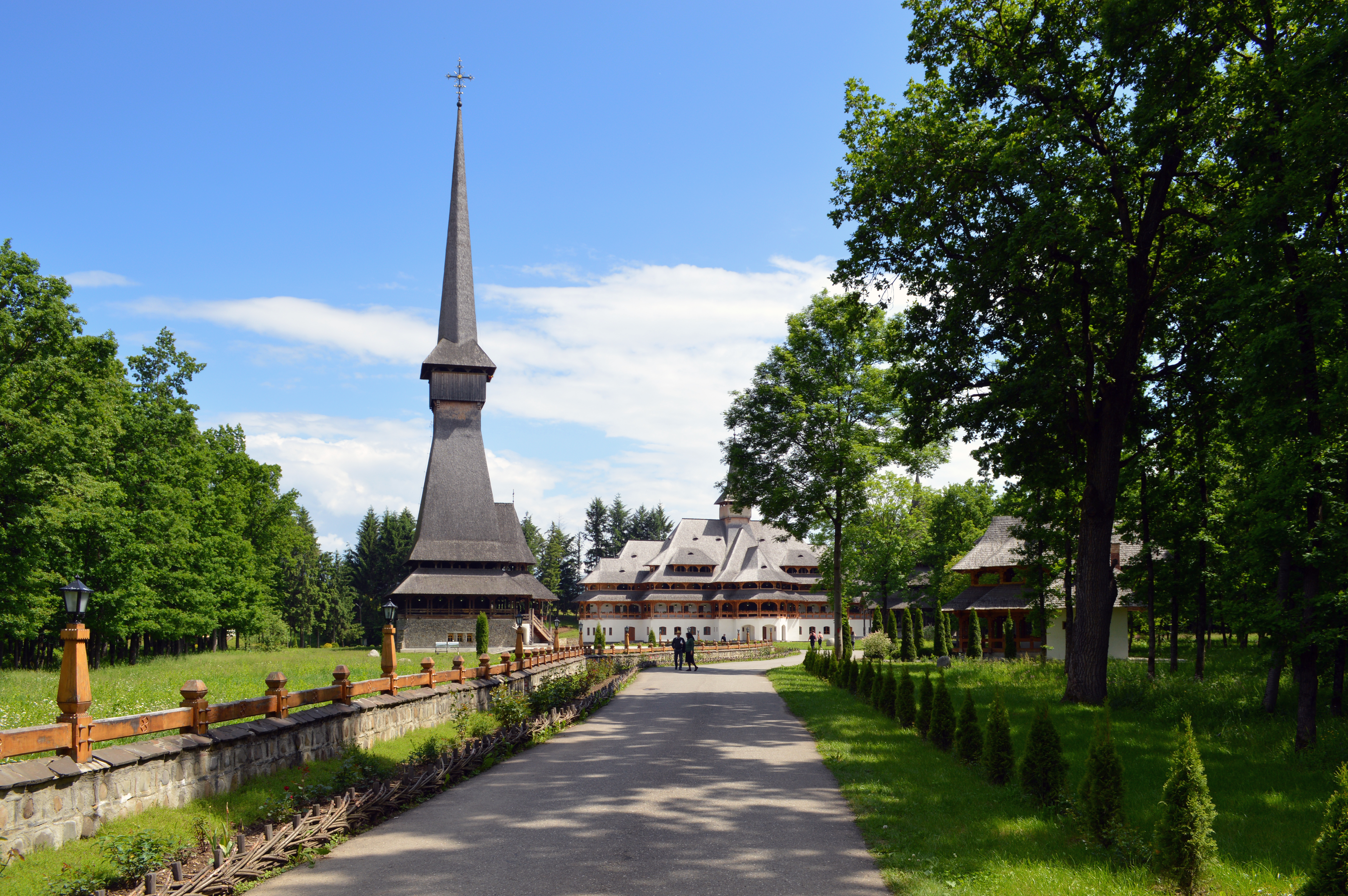
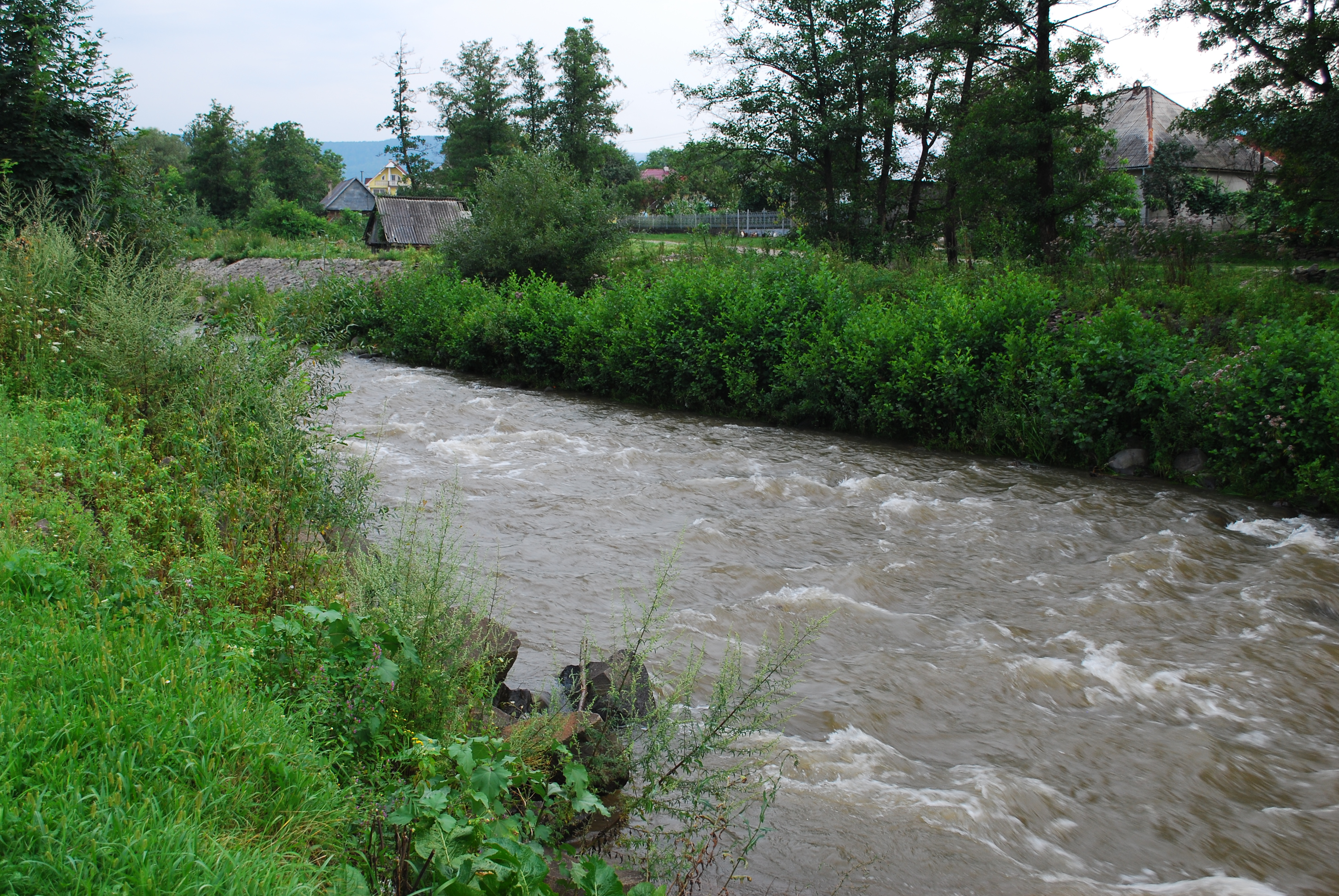
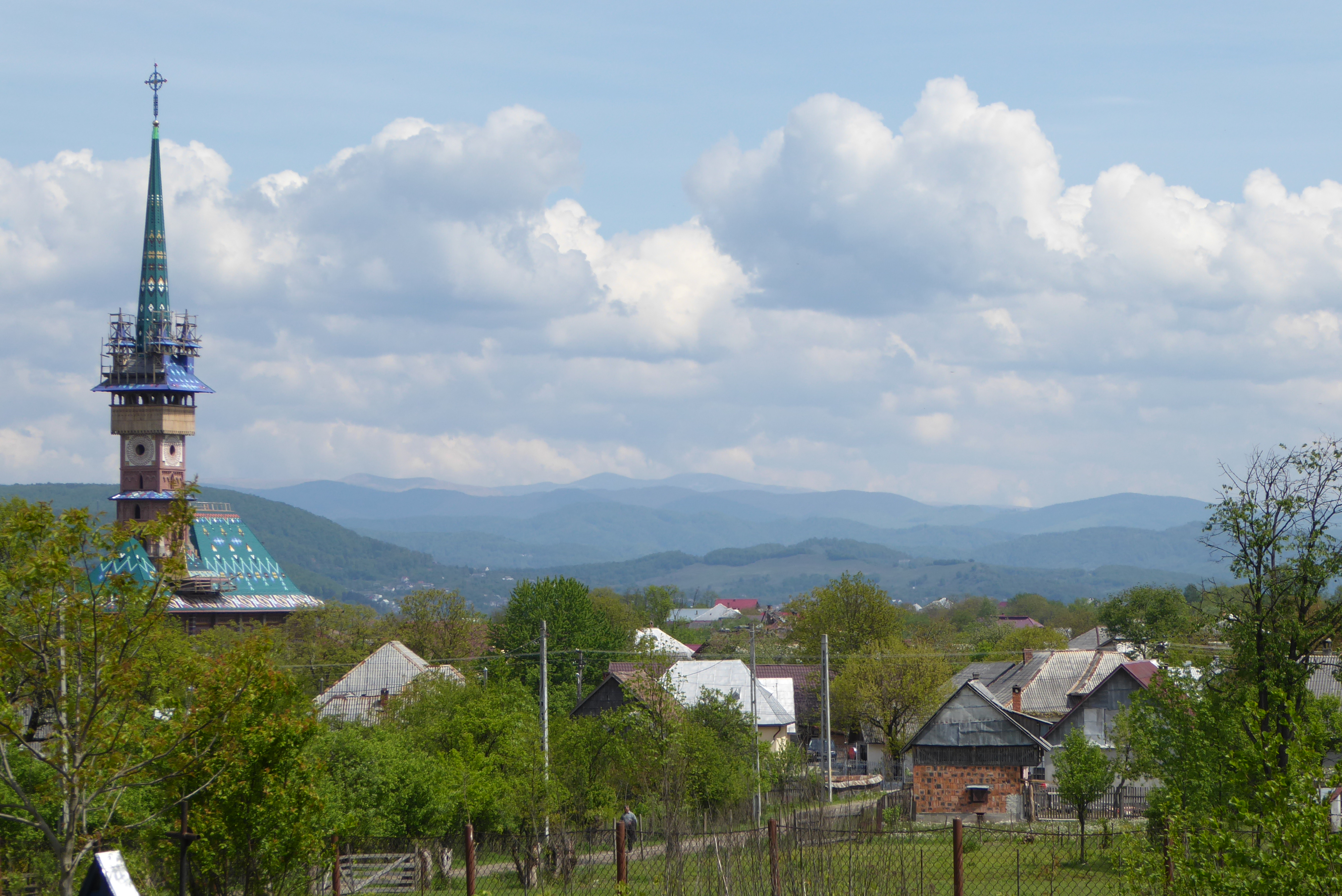
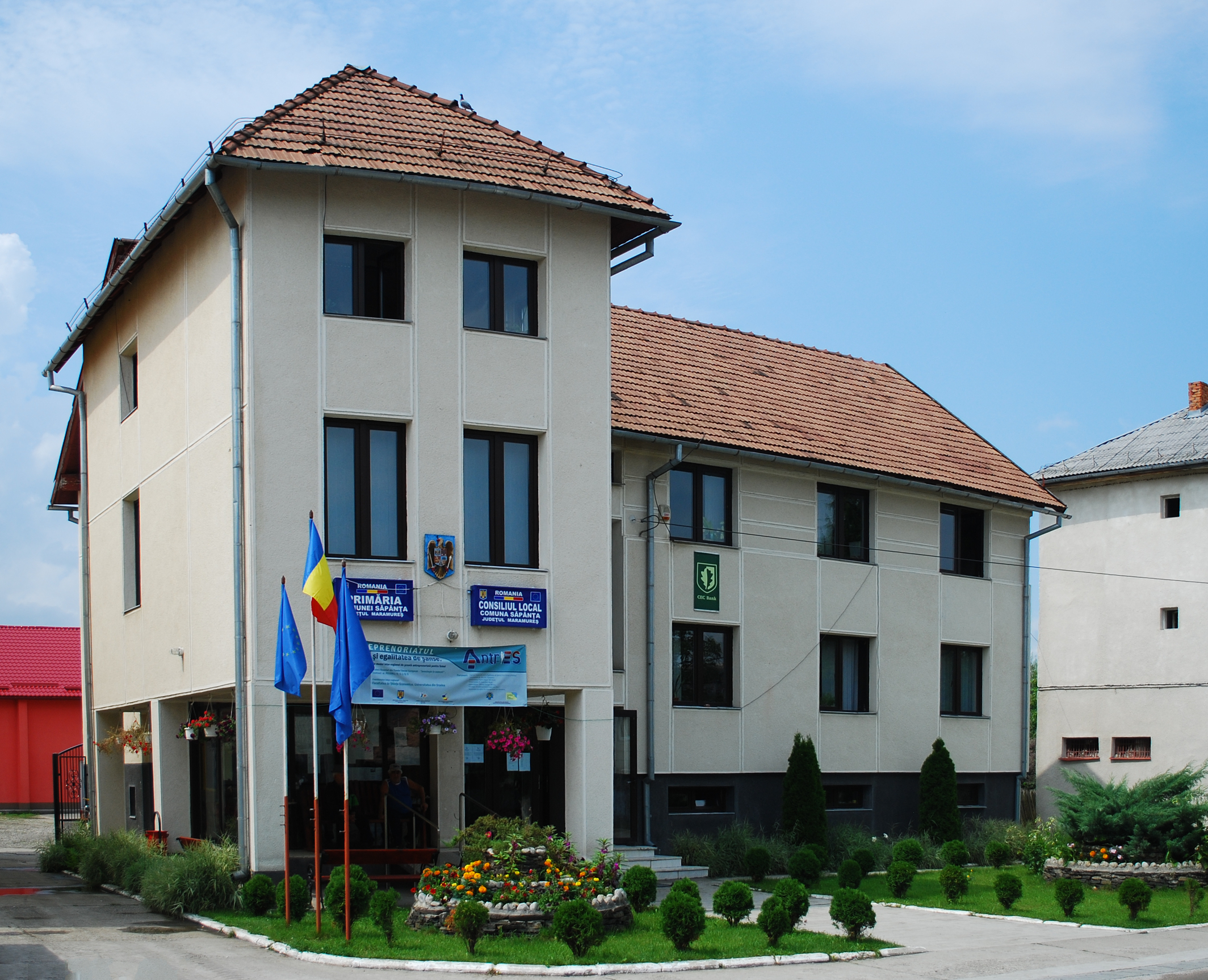
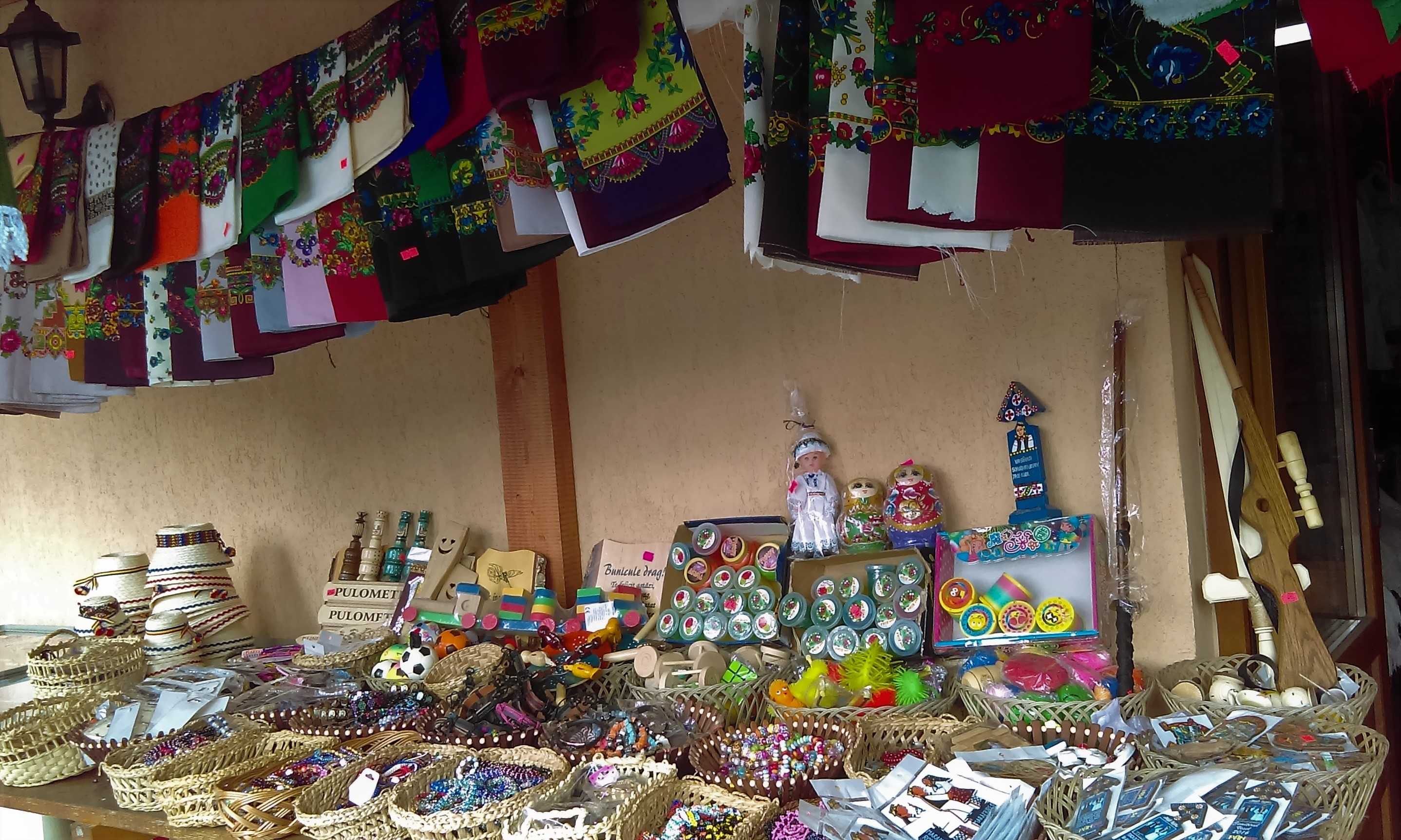
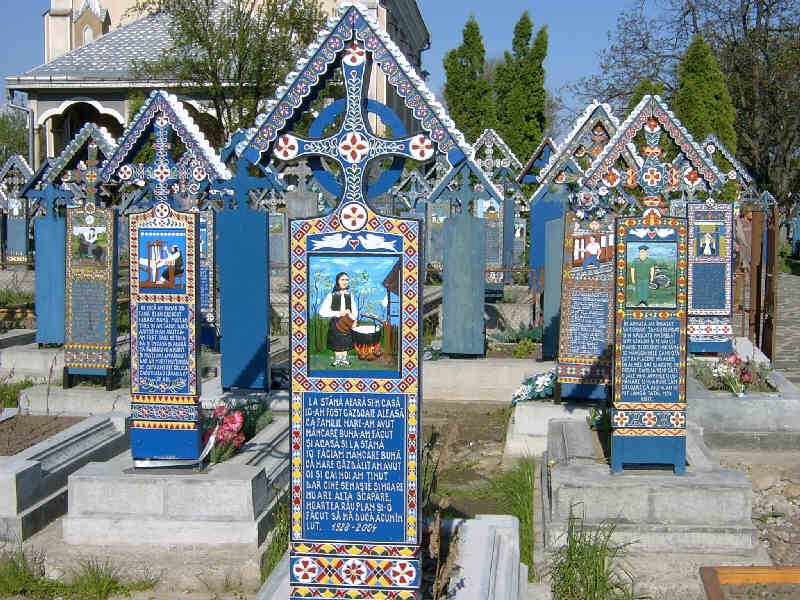
- From top and left: Săpânța-Peri Monastery seen from the entrance • Panoramic view of Săpânța • Săpânța River • Commune's town hall • Stylized traditional goods selling as souvenirs • The Merry Cemetery

- Location in Maramureș County

- Location in Romania
- Coordinates: 47.972°N 23.697°E
- Country: Romania
- County: Maramureș

Government
  - Mayor (2024–2028): Gheorghe Stan (PNL)
- Area: 139.17 km^{2} (53.73 sq mi)
- Elevation: 262 m (860 ft)
- Population (2021-12-01): 3,031
  - Density: 21.78/km^{2} (56.41/sq mi)
- Time zone: UTC+02:00 (EET)
  - Summer (DST): UTC+03:00 (EEST)
- Postal code: 437305
- Area code: (+40) 02 62
- Vehicle reg.: MM
- Website: primariacomuneisapanta.ro

Săpânța (Romanian pronunciation: [səˈpɨnt͡sa]; Hungarian: Szaplonca, Hungarian pronunciation: [sɒplontsɒ]; Yiddish: ספינקא, romanized: Shpinka or Spinka; Rusyn: Сопунка, Rusyn Latin: Sopunka) is a commune of 3,365 inhabitants situated in Maramureș County, Romania, 15 kilometers (9.3 mi) northwest of Sighetu Marmației at the northern foothills of the Gutâi Mountains and at the confluence of the Săpânța and Tisza rivers, less than one kilometer south of the border with Ukraine. It is composed of a single village, Săpânța.

Săpânța is located in the northwestern part of Maramureș County, 53 km (33 mi) due north of the county seat, Baia Mare. To the west it borders Țara Oașului, in Satu Mare County, and to the north, across the river Tisza, is Ukraine. The river Săpânța flows into the Tisza here. The locality is crossed by national road DN19, which starts in Oradea, goes through Satu Mare, and ends in Sighetu Marmației.

The commune is known for its "Merry Cemetery", one of the Seven Wonders of Romania. The Săpânța-Peri Monastery church is the world's tallest wooden church building, at 78 metres (256 feet).

== Etymology and history ==
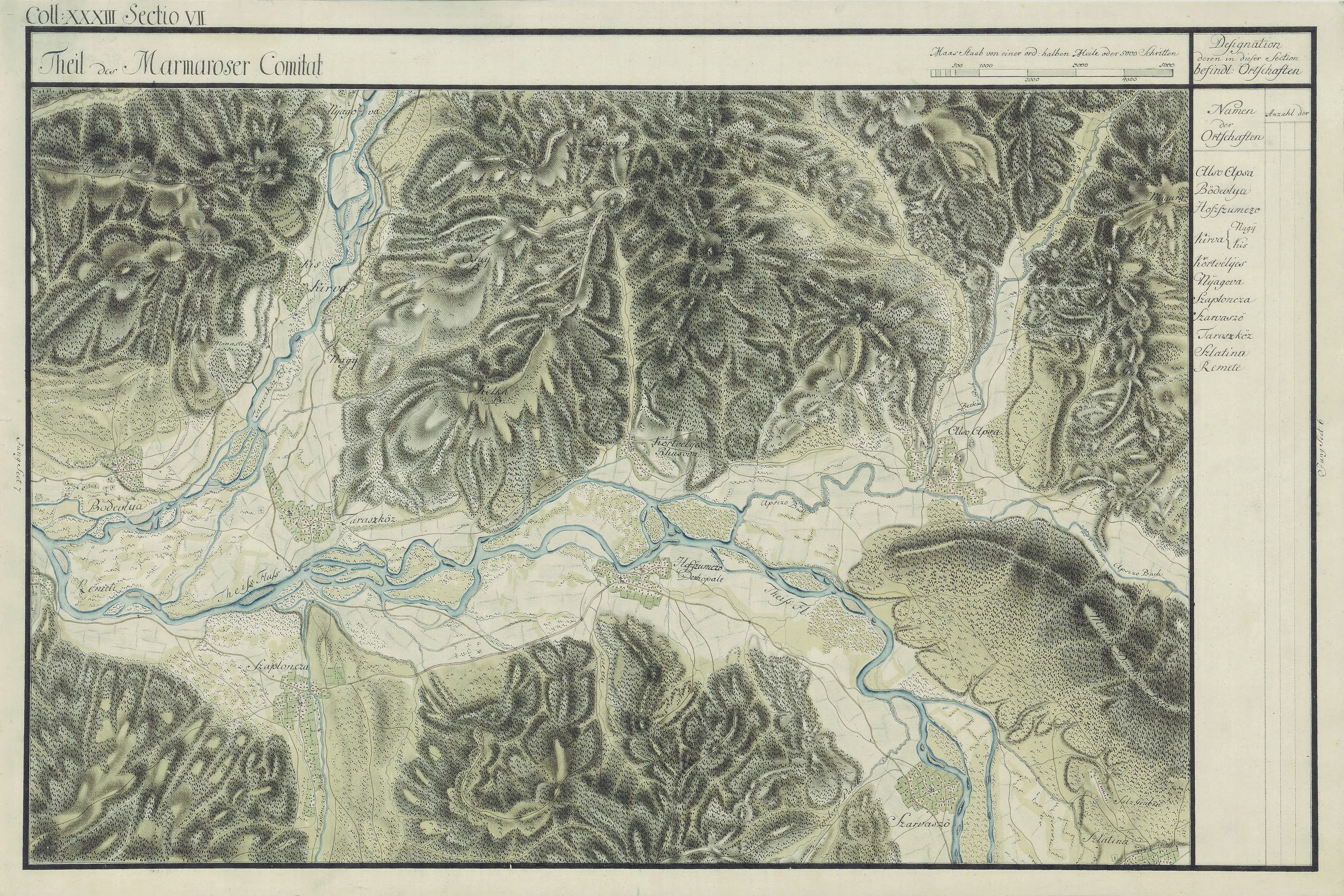
Săpânța in the Josephinian Land Survey of the Máramaros County, 1782–85.

The name Zapancha (today's Săpânța) was mentioned for the first time in the year 1373 in direct connection with a property conflict between the local noblemen and the Saxon and Hungarian settlers brought by the Hungarian Kingdom. In that diploma, the border between the territory granted to the colonists (which forms the border of Câmpulung la Tisa) and the border of Săpânța was established. The conflict lasted longer and is mentioned in several other diplomas from Maramures written by historian Ioan Mihalyi de Apsa in 1900.

A document from 1404 mentions a mill set in motion by the waters of the Săpânța River, which historian Tit Bud specifies to have had two wheels and belonged to the Saint Archangel Michael Monastery in Peri (today on the territory of Ukraine).

Săpânța is a very old settlement established in the Middle Ages. From the documents of the time, it appears that the inhabitants of the commune settled on the current territory at the beginning of the 13th century. Originary from other places with dense population, they came to the land of Maramureș to found a human settlement not with the purpose of colonization, but exercise their rights granted by the Holy Roman governors to deforest targeted areas and transform them into arable land. The workmen, being physically gifted people, managed to incorporate large areas into their commune, much larger in extent than any of the neighboring communes.

== Demography ==
Historical population
Year	Pop.	±%
1880	1,982	—
1900	2,558	+29.1%
1910	3,475	+35.8%
1930	3,727	+7.3%
1956	3,436	−7.8%
1977	3,391	−1.3%
1992	3,318	−2.2%
2002	3,267	−1.5%
2011	2,903	−11.1%
2021	3,031	+4.4%
Source: Census data

Ethnic componence of Săpânța
1. Romanians (96.2%)
2. Other (0.10%)
3. unknown (3.70%)
Confessional componence of Săpânța
1. Orthodox (83.8%)
2. Adventists (7.03%)
3. Greek Catholics (4.85%)
4. Other (0.46%)
5. unknown (3.86%)

According to the 1930 population and housing census, 3,727 inhabitants were registered, of which 2,668 Romanians, 998 Jews, 22 Roma, 18 Hungarians, and 13 Ukrainians. In terms of denomination, the population consisted of 2,577 Greek Catholics, 999 Mosaics, 88 Adventists and 29 Orthodox.

In the 2002 population and housing census, from a total of 3,267 inhabitants, 3,240 were Romanians, 17 Roma, 8 Ukrainians, and 2 Hungarians. By denomination there were 2,936 Orthodox, 257 Seventh-day Adventists, 65 Greek Catholics, 3 Pentecostals, one Roman Catholic, and one Reformed Catholic.

According to the 2021 Population and Housing Census, the population of Săpânța commune amounts to 3,031 inhabitants, an increase compared to the 2011 Population Census, when 2,903 inhabitants were registered. Most of the inhabitants are Romanians (96.21%), and for 3.7% the ethnicity is unknown. From a confessional point of view, the majority of the inhabitants belong to the Romanian Orthodox Church (83.8%), with minorities of Adventists (7.03%) and Greek Catholics (4.85%), and for 3.86% the affiliation is unknown confessionally.

=== Local Jewish community ===
Before the Second World War, an important Jewish community lived in Săpânța. In 1920 there were 1,023 Jews in Săpânța, which was the original home of the Spinka dynasty of Hasidic Rebbes. This is where the Spinka Hasidic dynasty was born. In World War II, the Jews of the village were deported (including Isaac Hirsch Weiss) by the Horthy authorities to Auschwitz, where most were killed. The survivors were persecuted by the Romanian communist authorities, emigrating to Israel or the United States and re-founding the dynasty.

=== Politics and administration ===
The commune of Săpânța is administered by a mayor and a local council composed of 13 councilors. The mayor, Ion Braicu, from the Social Democratic Party (PSD), has been in office since 2020. Starting with the local elections in 2020, the local council has the following composition by political parties: In June 2024, Gheorghe Stan from the National Liberal Party (PNL) has been elected as the new mayor of the commune. He is due to take over the mayor's office in September 2024.

== Public attractions ==
The biggest public attraction of the commune is the Merry Cemetery famous for its brightly coloured tombstones with naïve paintings describing, in an original and poetic manner, the people who are buried there in addition to scenes from their lives. The Merry Cemetery became an open-air museum and a national tourist attraction. It has been listed as one of the Seven Wonders of Romania by Imperator Travel. The unusual feature of this cemetery is that it diverges from the prevalent belief, culturally shared within European societies, that views death as something indelibly solemn.

A collection of the epitaphs from the Merry Cemetery exists in a 2017 volume called Crucile de la Săpânța, compiled by author Roxana Mihalcea, as well as in a photography book titled The Merry Cemetery of Sapanta by Peter Kayafas.

== Natives ==
- Stan Ioan Pătraș (1908–1977), wood sculptor, the creator of the tombstones in the Merry Cemetery
- Gheorghe Turda (born 1948), folk singer

== Gallery ==
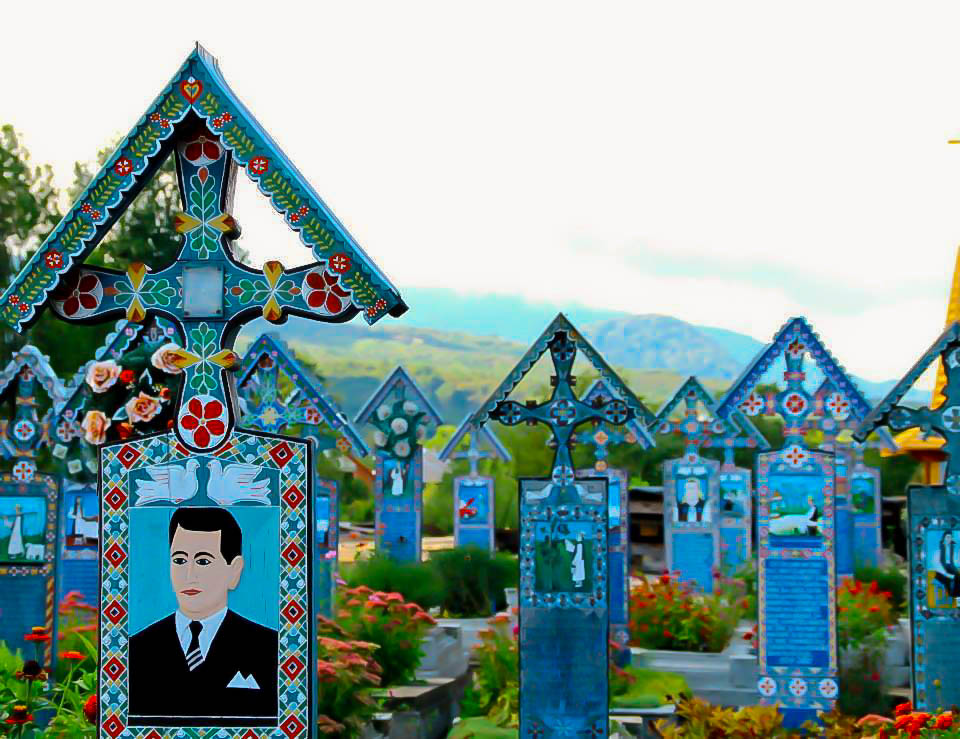
Merry Cemetery, unique in Europe

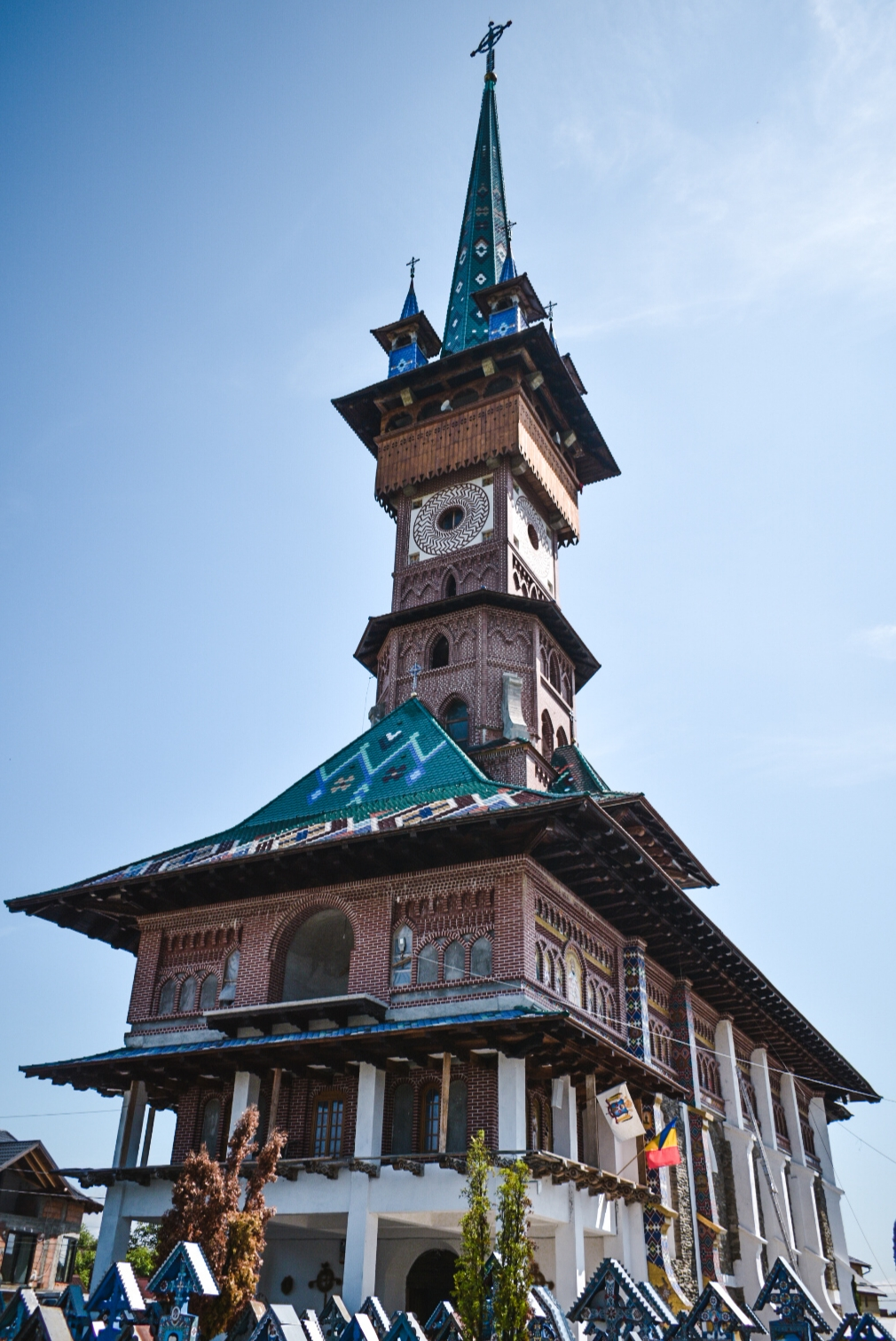
Church at the Merry Cemetery

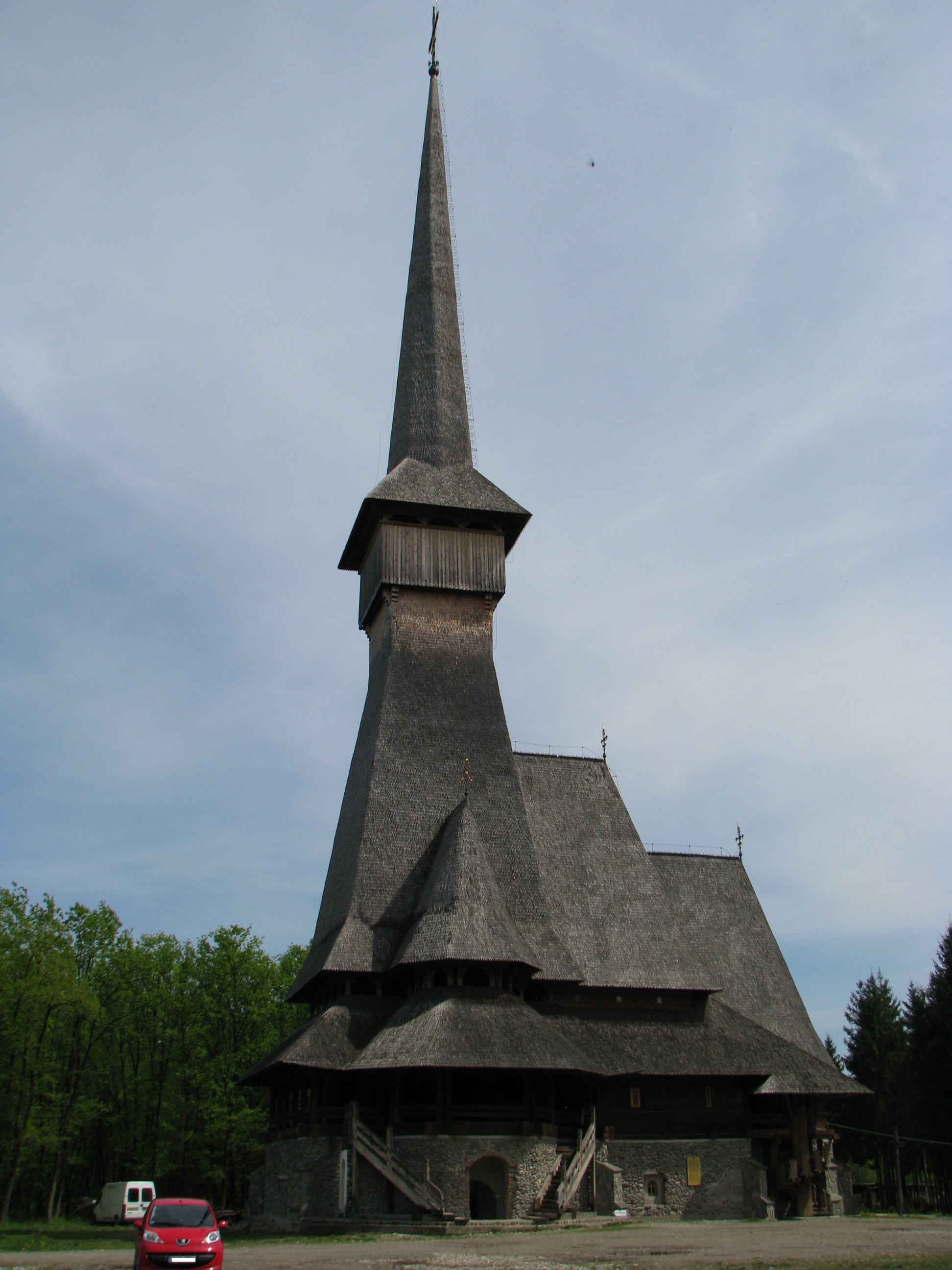
Săpânța-Peri Monastery church, the tallest wooden church in the world

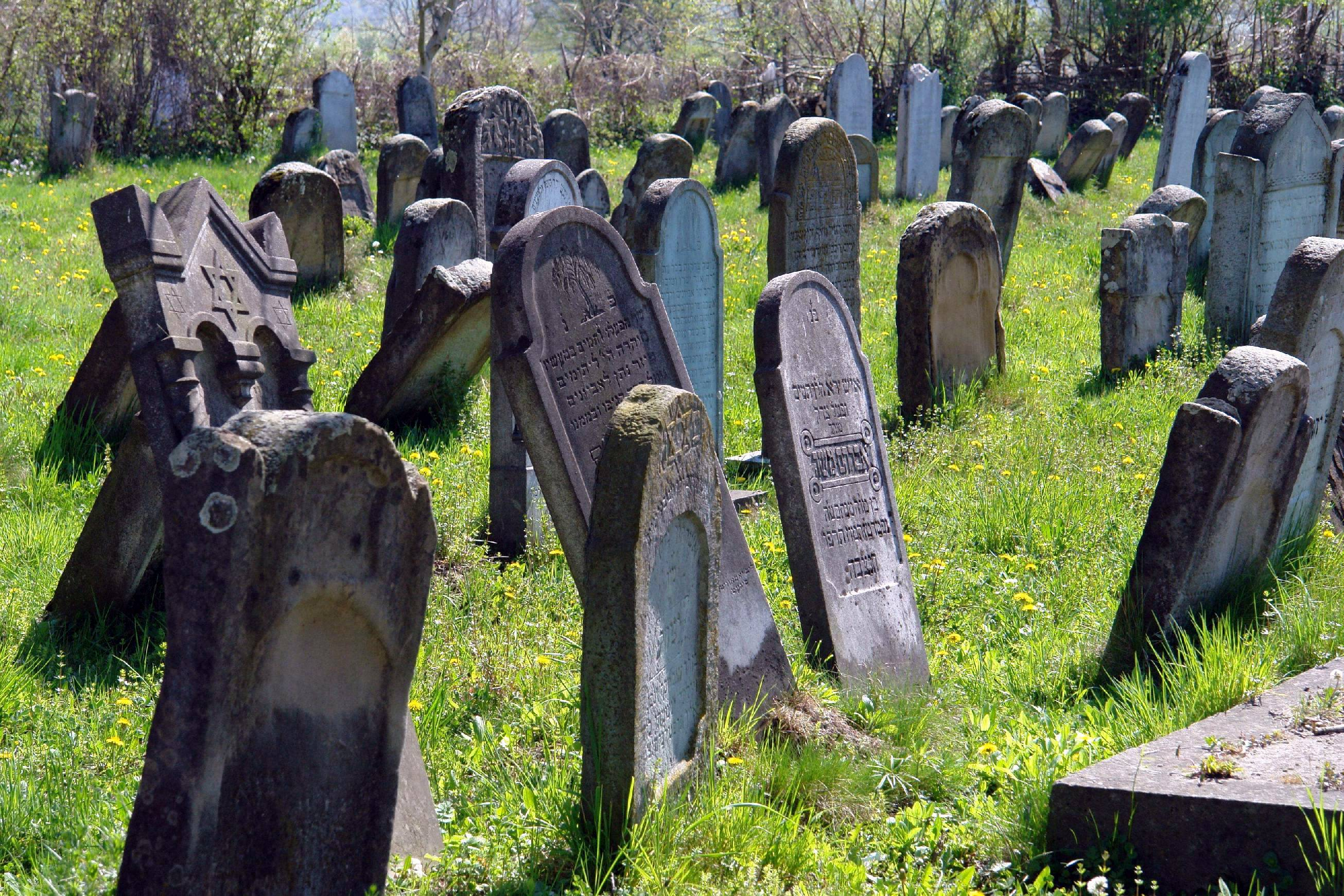
The Jewish cemetery

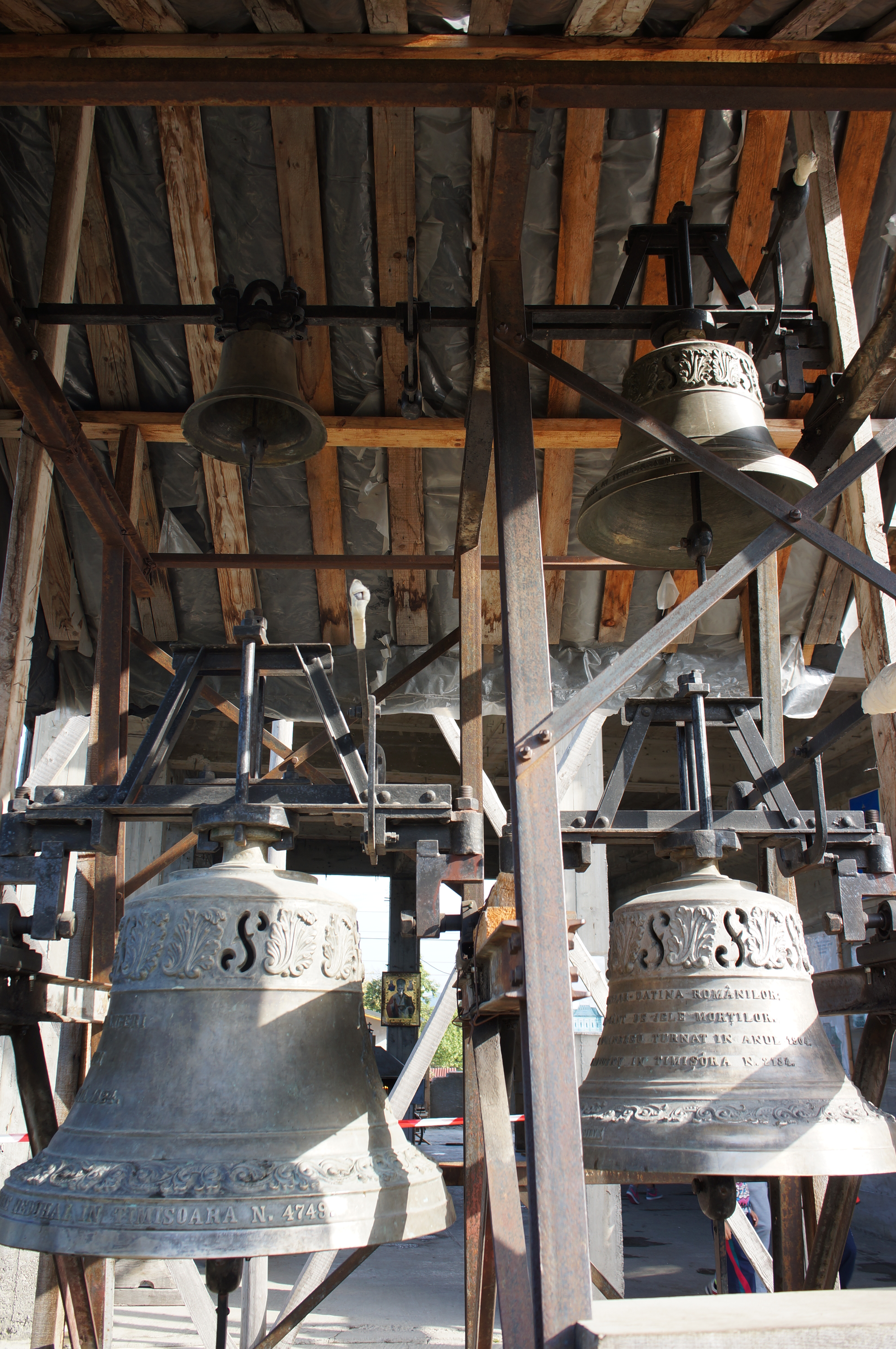
Functional church bells in the Merry Cemetery
