= Propsteikirche =

Propsteikirche means provost or abbey church in German.

Churches named Propsteikirche include:

- Propsteikirche St. Laurentius, Kloster Wedinghausen, Arnsberg
- Propsteikirche St. Ludgerus, Billerbeck
- Propsteikirche St. Peter und Paul, Bochum, Bochum
- Propsteikirche Maria Himmelfahrt, Bolzano
- Propsteikirche St. Petrus und Andreas, Brilon
- Propsteikirche St. Urbanus, Buer
- Propsteikirche St. Peter und Paul, Dessau, Dessau
- Propsteikirche, Dortmund (St. Johannes Baptist)
- Propsteikirche St. Augustinus, Gelsenkirchen
- Propsteipfarrkirche St. Mariä Himmelfahrt, Jülich
- Propsteikirche St. Nikolaus, Kiel
- Propsteikirche, Königsberg
- Propsteikirche St. Remigius, Kusel
- Propsteikirche, Leipzig (St. Trinitatis)
- Propsteikirche Herz Jesu, Lübeck
- Propsteikirche St. Vitus, Meppen
- Propsteikirche St. Anna, Schwerin
- Propsteikirche St. Patrokli, Soest
- Propsteikirche St. Georg, Vechta
- Propsteikirche St. Josef, Verden an der Aller
- Propsteikirche St. Gertrud von Brabant, Wattenscheid
