= Propsteikirche, Dortmund =

Propsteikirche
- Propsteikirche St. Johannes Baptist
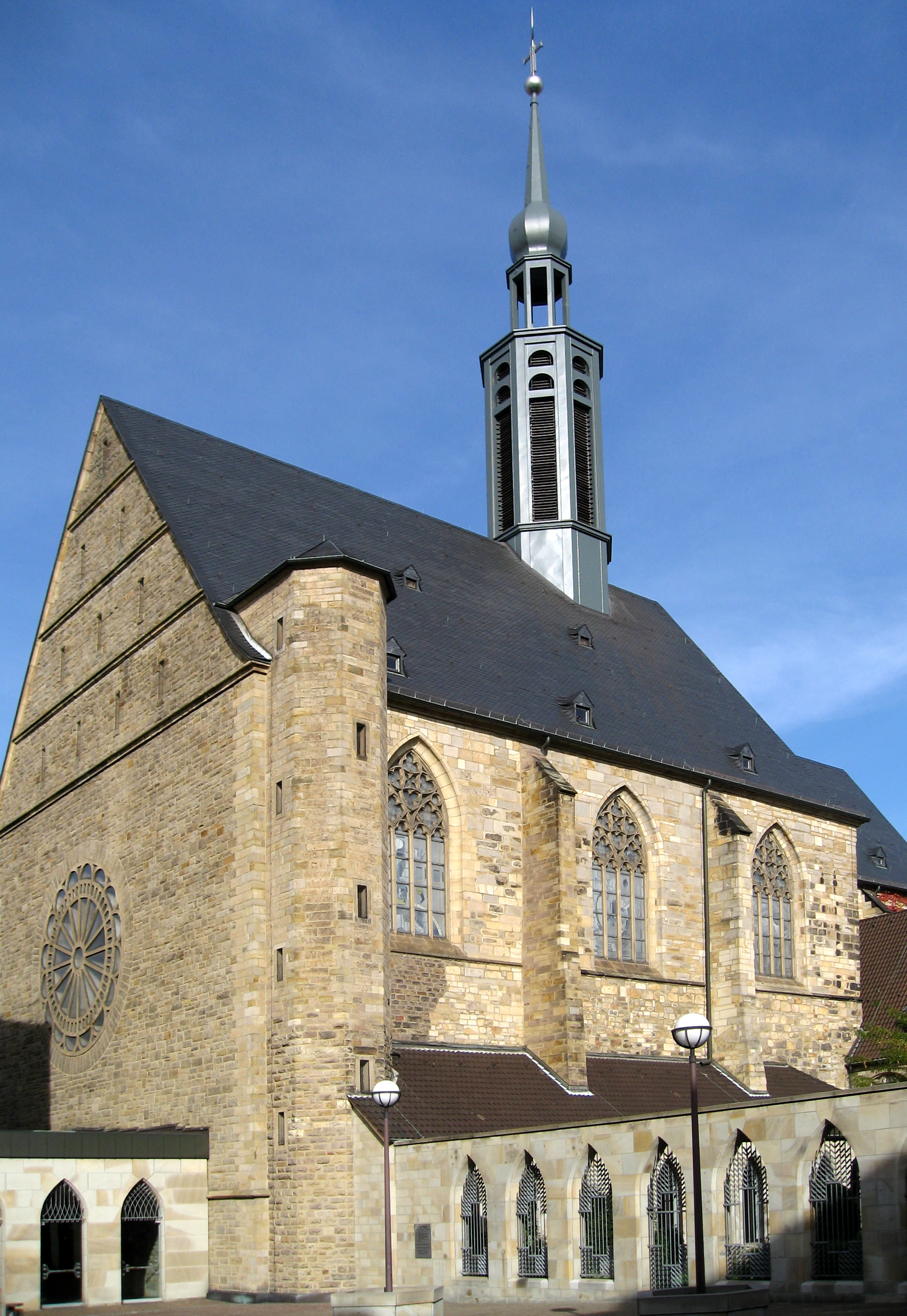

- Location within North Rhine-Westphalia Location within Germany
- 51°30′49″N 07°27′46″E
- Location: Dortmund, North Rhine-Westphalia
- Country: Germany
- Denomination: Catholic
- Website: www.propsteikirche-dortmund.de

History
- Status: church
- Dedication: John the Baptist
- Consecrated: 1450

Architecture
- Functional status: active
- Heritage designation: listed
- Architectural type: hall church
- Style: Gothic
- Groundbreaking: 1331
- Demolished: 1943, rebuilt 1947–66

Administration
- Diocese: Diocese of Paderborn

Propsteikirche is the common name of a church in Dortmund, North Rhine-Westphalia, Germany, the only Catholic church in the city centre. The full name is Propsteikirche St. Johannes Baptist Dortmund. It was built from 1331 as the abbey church of a Dominican monastery. Consecrated in 1458, it features a late-Gothic high altar by Derick Baegert which shows the oldest depiction of Dortmund.

The church became the first Catholic church in Dortmund after the Reformation, a Propsteikirche from 1859. Destroyed in World War II, it was rebuilt until 1966. Its organ, built in 1988, makes it a concert venue.

== History ==
A Dominican abbey was founded in Dortmund in 1330, and a first abbey church was built from 1331 to 1353, consecrated in 1354, dedicated to John the Baptist. It was soon expanded to a Gothic hall church, begun in 1404 and consecrated in 1458. The church of a mendicant order, it was mainly a place for prayer and built simple and without a steeple. The abbey was dissolved during the secularization in 1816. The church became the first Catholic parish church in Dortmund after the Reformation in 1819. It was promoted to a Provost church in 1859. The former abbey buildings were used to house the priest and as school buildings.

The church was destroyed in World War II in 1943. Its most important art treasures had been removed, surviving the war. The church was rebuilt from 1947 to 1967. It is a listed monument.

== Altar ==
The church features a late-Gothic high altar by Derick Baegert, focused on the themes of the Passion and Crucifixion. It shows in the background of the left panel the oldest depiction of Dortmund.

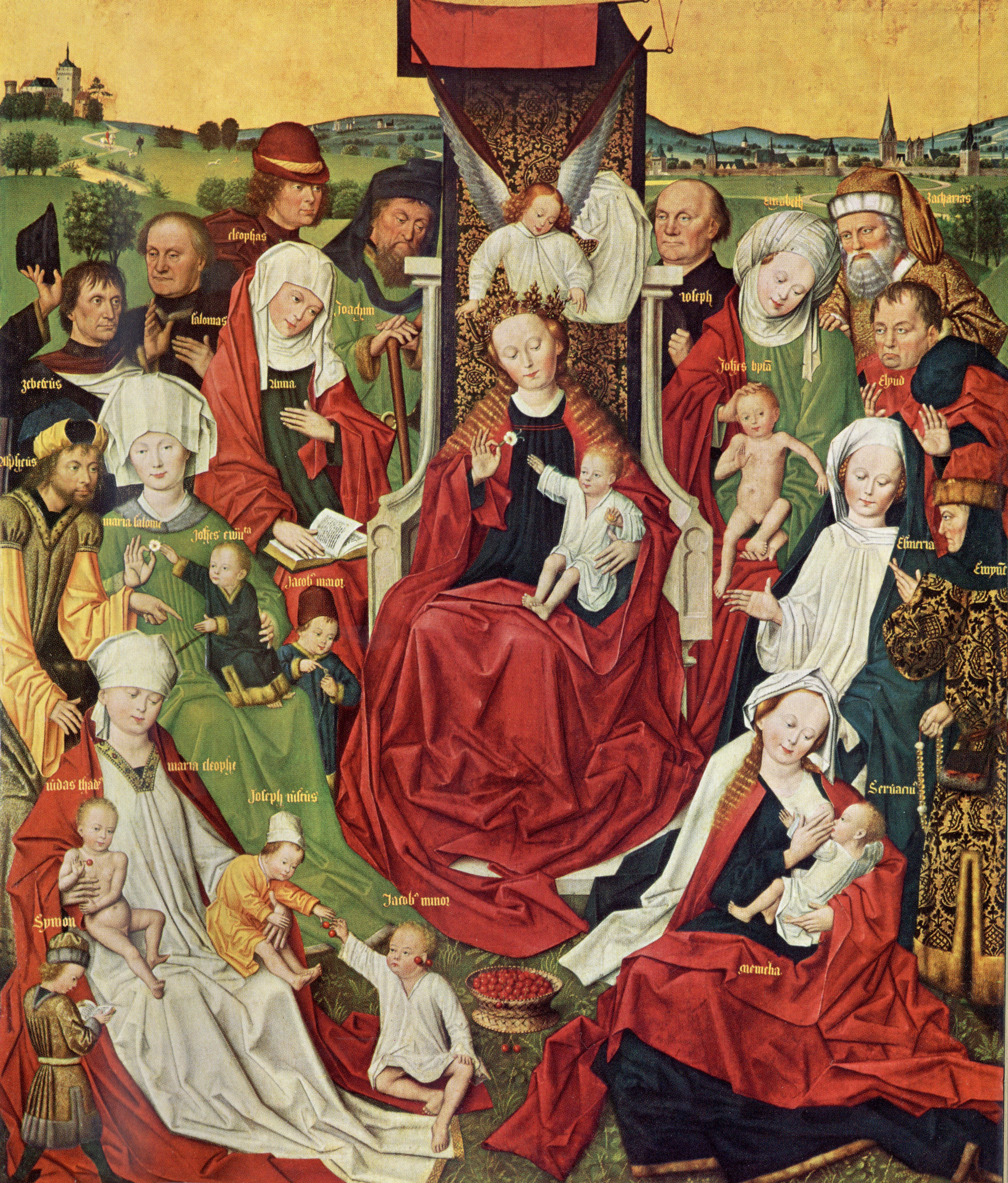

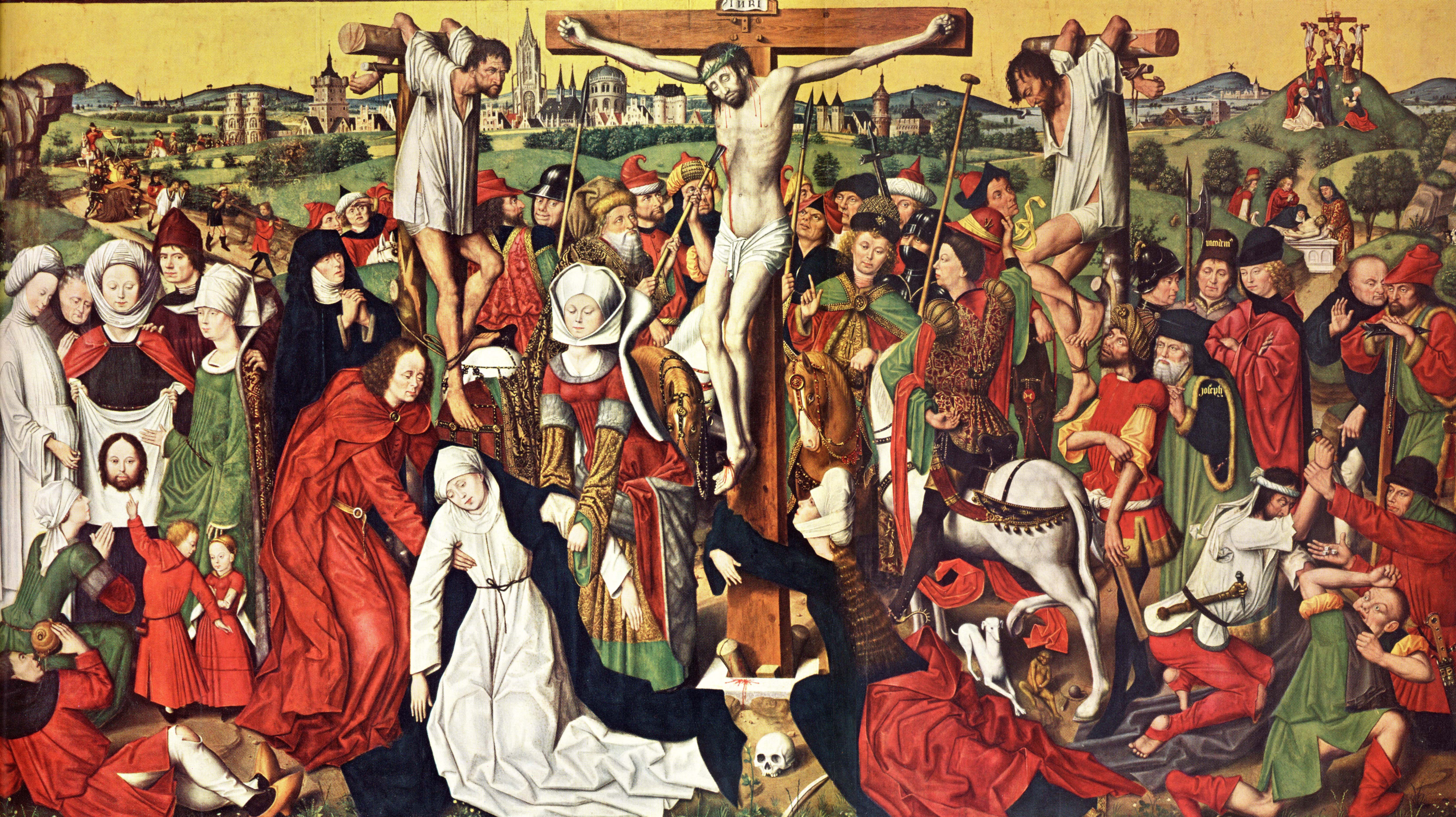
Altar triptych from the Propsteikirche in Dortmund

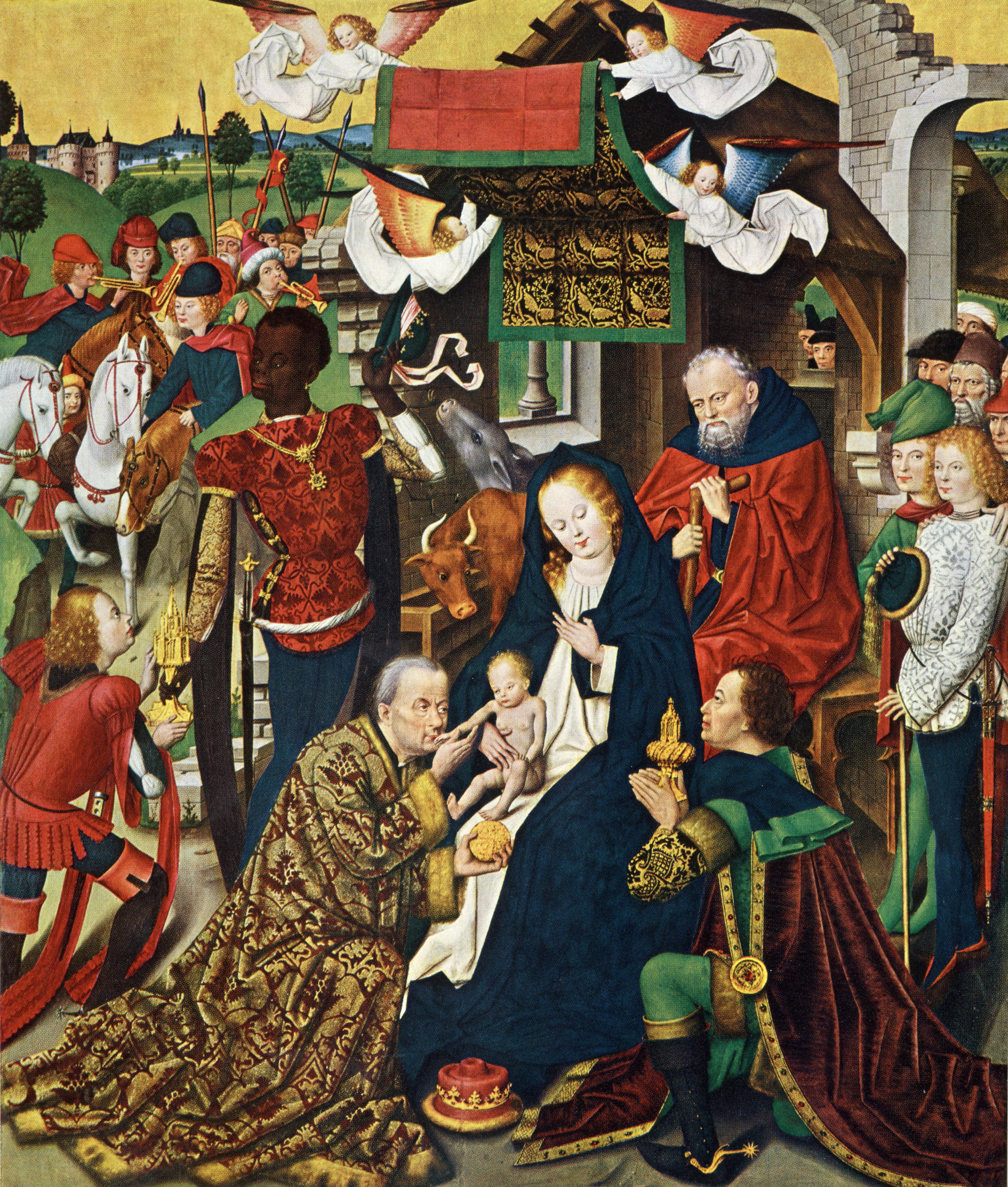

== Organ ==
Interior, view of the main altar

Interior, view from the main altar, and the organ

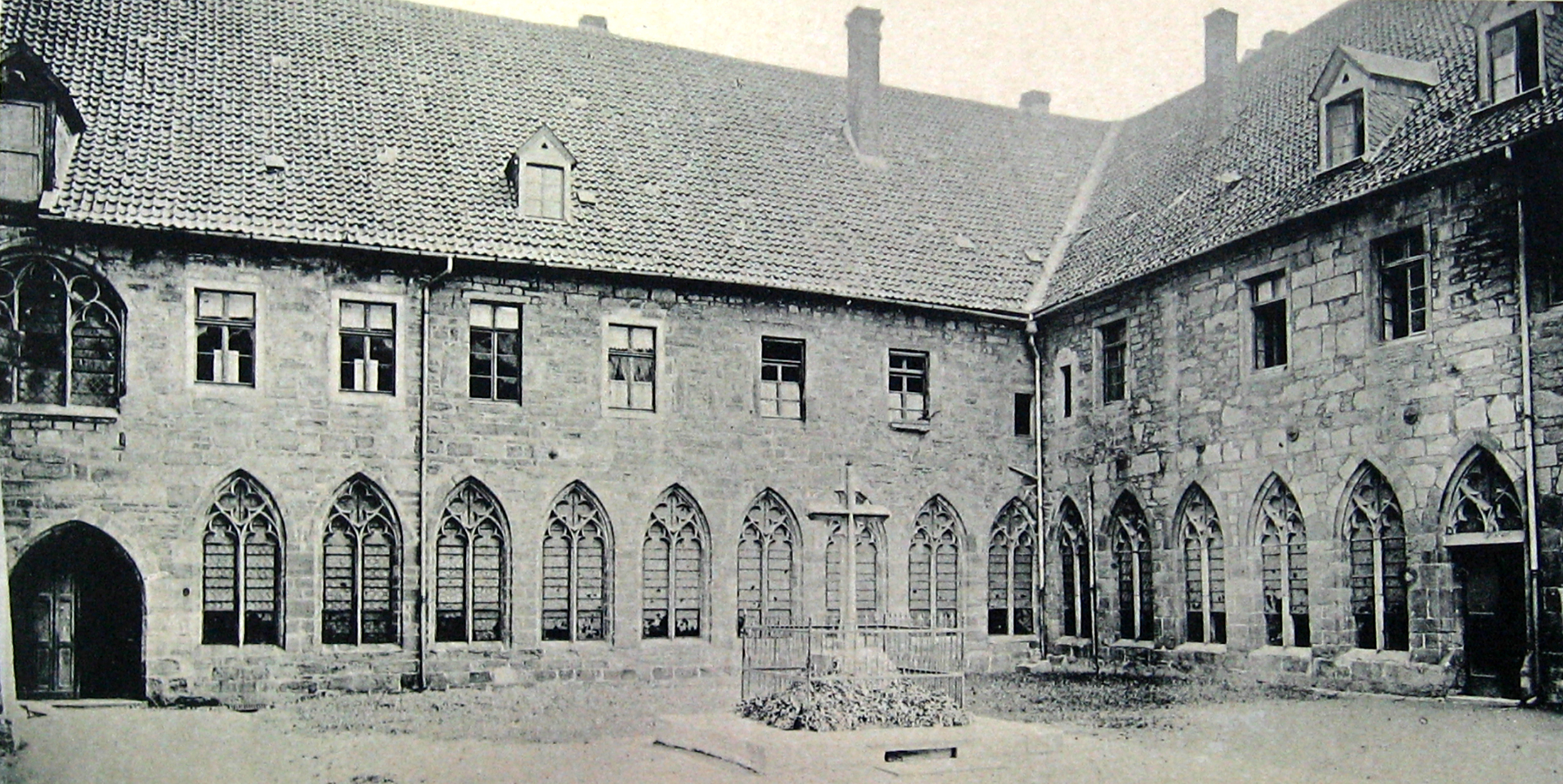
Monastery in 1894

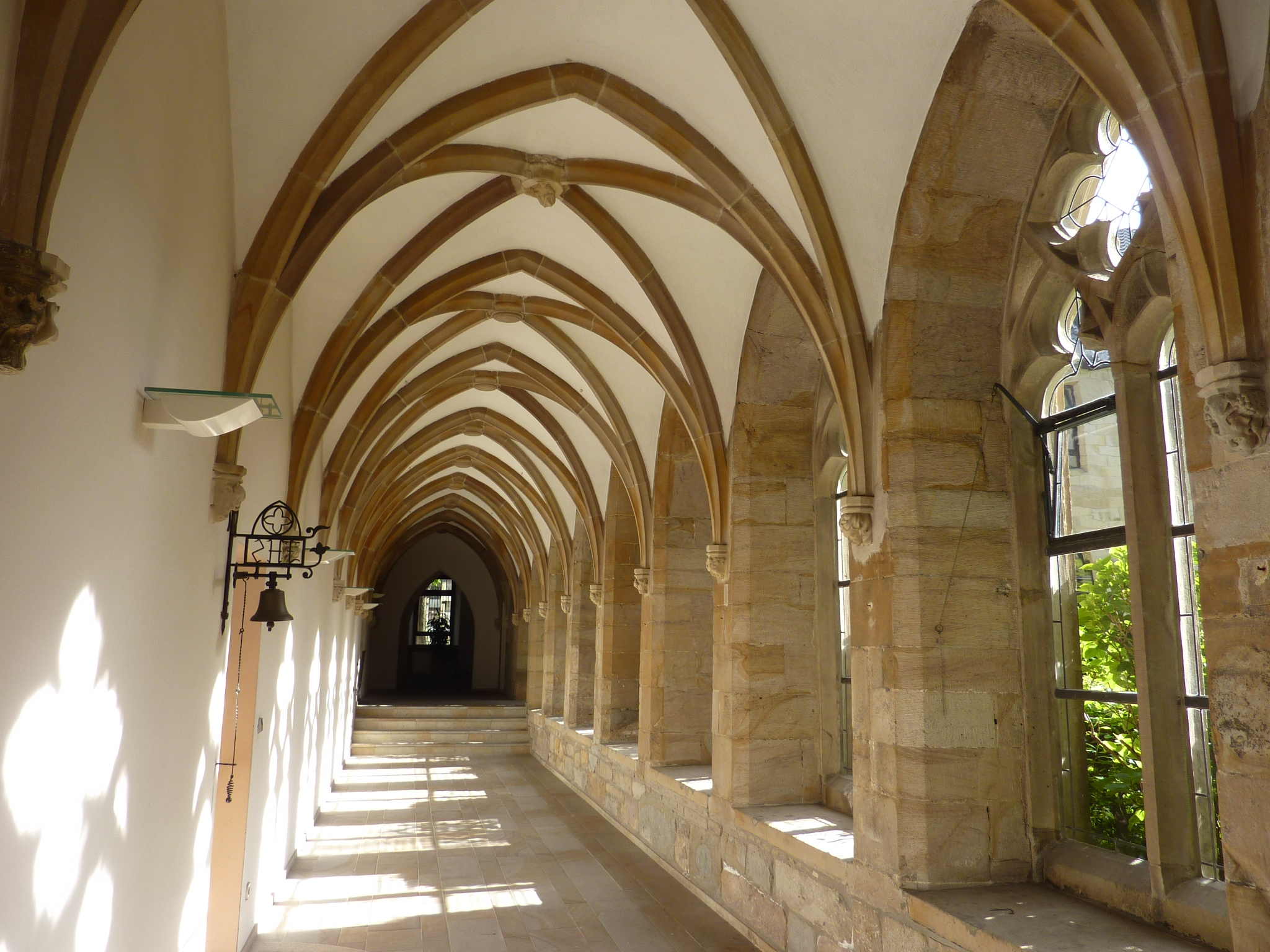
Cloisters in 2013

The present organ was built in 1988 by Siegfried Sauer. It is often used for concerts and recordings. It is a universal organ with 52 stops on three manuals and pedal.

== Literature ==
- Elisabeth Baxhenrich-Hartmann, Der Hochaltar des Derick Baegert in der Propsteikirche zu Dortmund, Studien zur Kunst- und Dominikanergeschichte Dortmunds in der 2. Hälfte des 15. Jahrhunderts, Dortmund 1984
- Rolf Fritz, Museum für Kunst und Kulturgeschichte, Derick Baegert, Hochaltar der Propsteikirche Dortmund, Dortmund 1963
- Theodor Rensing, Das Dortmunder Dominikanerkloster (1309–1816), Münster 1936
- Norbert Reimann, Dortmund-Dominikaner, in: Westfälisches Urkundenbuch, Bd. 1, Münster 1992, S. 261–268.
- Wolfgang Rinke: Dortmunder Kirchen des Mittelalters. Dortmund 1991, ISBN 3-7932-5032-6
- Wolfgang Rinke: Der Altar in der Propsteikirche zu Dortmund – Geschichte, Kunstgeschichte, Bildbeschreibung. Cramers Kunstanstalt, Dortmund 1992. ISBN 3-924302-53-7
- Thomas Schilp, Barbara Welzel: Die Dortmunder Dominikaner im späten Mittelalter und die Propsteikirche als Erinnerungsort. Verlag für Regionalgeschichte. Bielefeld 2006. ISBN 3-89534-628-4
