= Jan Joest =

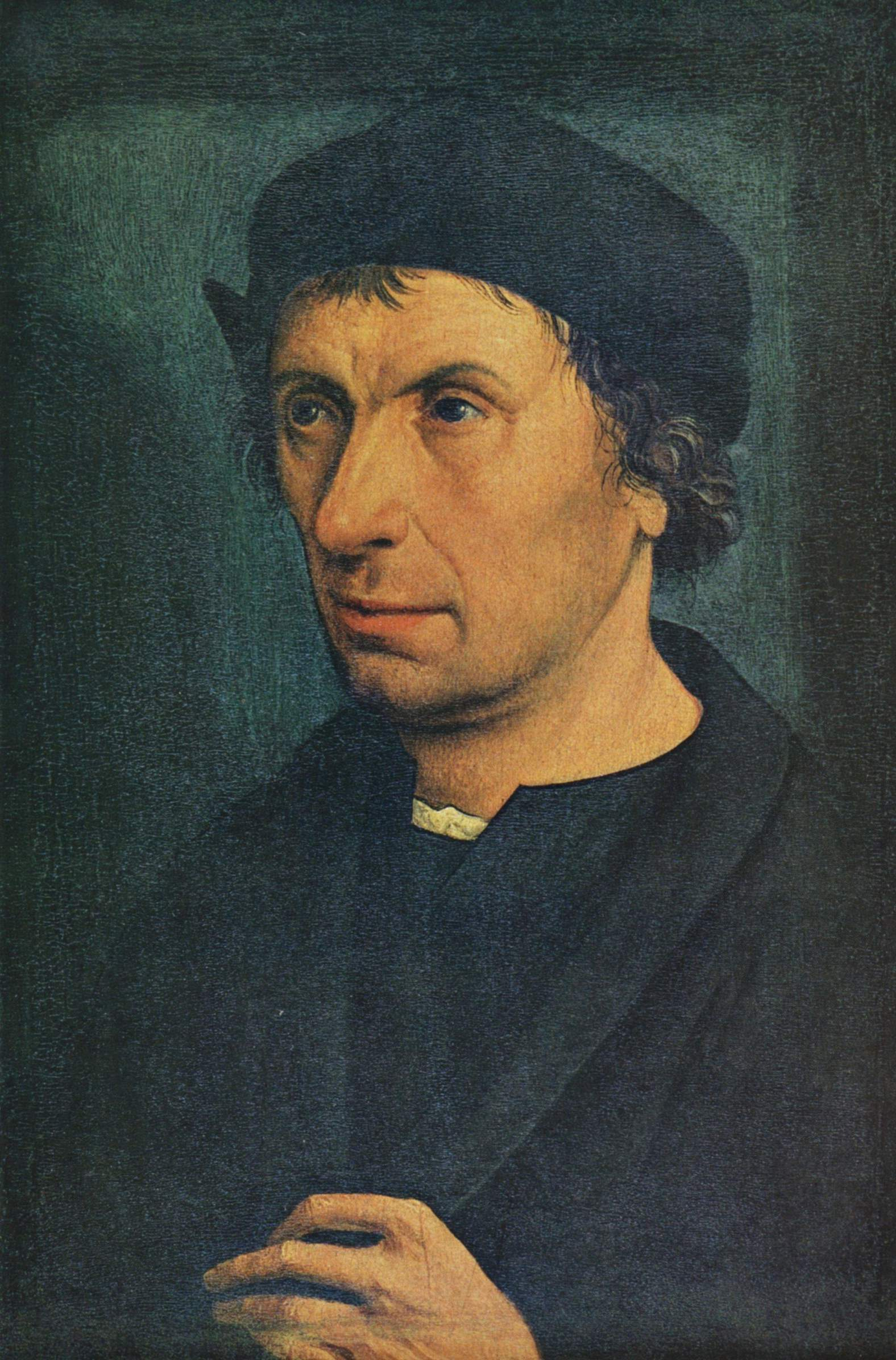
Portrait of a man, around 1505. 32 × 31 cm. Wood. Germanisches Nationalmuseum, Nürnberg

Jan Joest, also known as Jan Joest van Kalkar or Jan Joest van Calcar (between 1450 and 1460 – 1519), was a Dutch painter from either Kalkar or Wesel (both now in Germany), known for his religious paintings.

== Biography ==
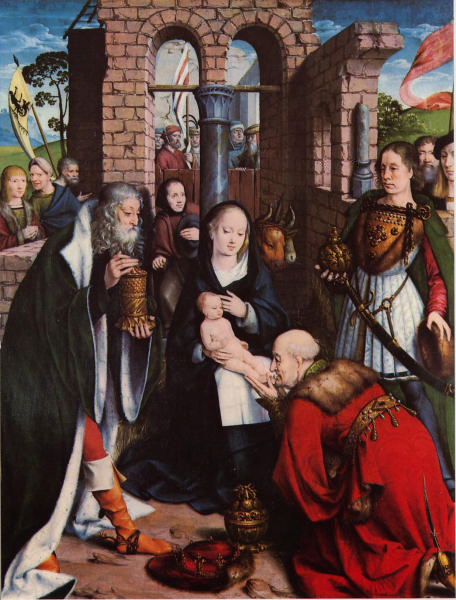
One of twenty panels in the St. Nicolai church in Kalkar.

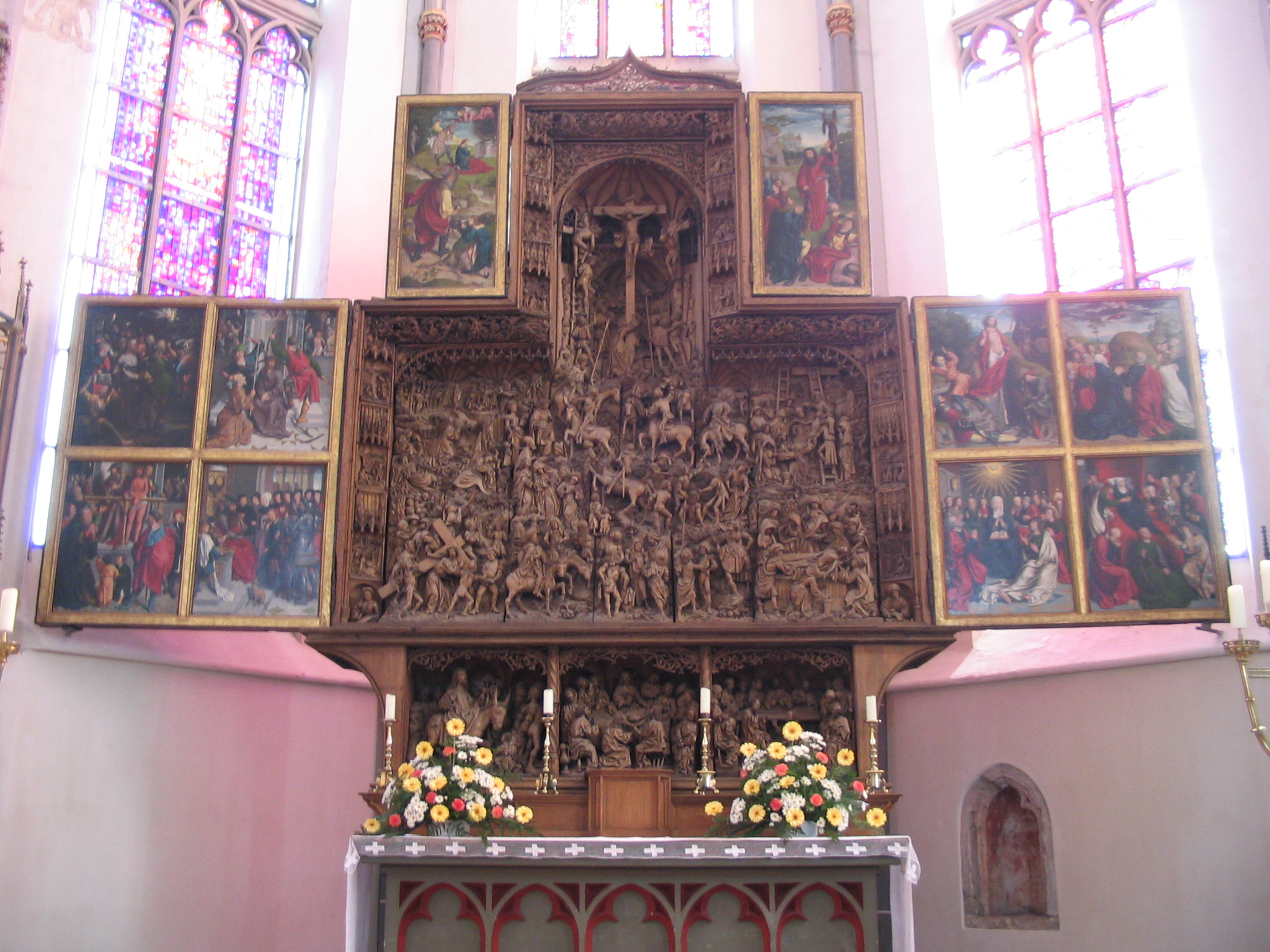
The high altar at St. Nicolai's Church, Kalkar

Jan Joest was practically unknown until 1874, when two men, Jacob Anton Wolff and Oskar Eisenmann, established his identity.

Not much of Joest's life is known beyond his paintings. He was the son of Heinrich Joest and Katharina Baegert, the sister of Derick Baegert, who was probably the first teacher of Joest. His greatest work, scenes of the life of Christ, were made between 1505 and 1508 on the high altar in St. Nicholai's Church in his hometown of Kalkar. Using documents found there, Wolff discovered that, in 1518, Joest worked in Cologne for the Hackeney family, before leaving, most likely for Italy, where he saw Genoa and Naples.

Joest then returned North, and settled in Haarlem. It is possible that this is the same person as Jan Joesten van Hillegom that registered in the Haarlem Guild of St. Luke in 1502 and who made a painting of Willibrord and Bavo of Ghent for the Egmond Abbey. The last edition of Adriaen van der Willingen's work of Haarlem painters mentions the burial of an artist there called "Jan Joosten" in 1519.

Two of Joest's apprentices were Barthel Bruyn (his brother-in-law) and Joos van Cleve. Karel van Mander's Schilder-boeck mentions an Ioan van Calcker (Jan van Calcar), living in Venice as a disciple of Titian in 1536–7. Karel van Mander further claimed that he illustrated the book of anatomy by Vesalius, and died in Naples in 1546.

== Work ==
Joest has been compared to David and Memling, but he more properly belongs to the school of Scorel. One of the features of Joest's work is the exquisite transparency of his coloring and the subtle and delicate modelling of the faces. Twenty panels painted by him can be seen in the church at Kalkar. Other works attributed to Joest are in Wesel and Rees, as well as the "Death of the Virgin" in and "Life of Kleitz" Munich.
