= St. Ludger Church, Billerbeck =

Church in Billerbeck, Germany

St Luger's Church
- Provost and Pilgrimage Church of Saint Ludger
- Ludger's Cathedral; Provost Church of St Ludger
- Propstei- und Wallfahrtskirche St. Ludgerus; Propsteikirche St. Ludgerus; Ludgerus-Dom
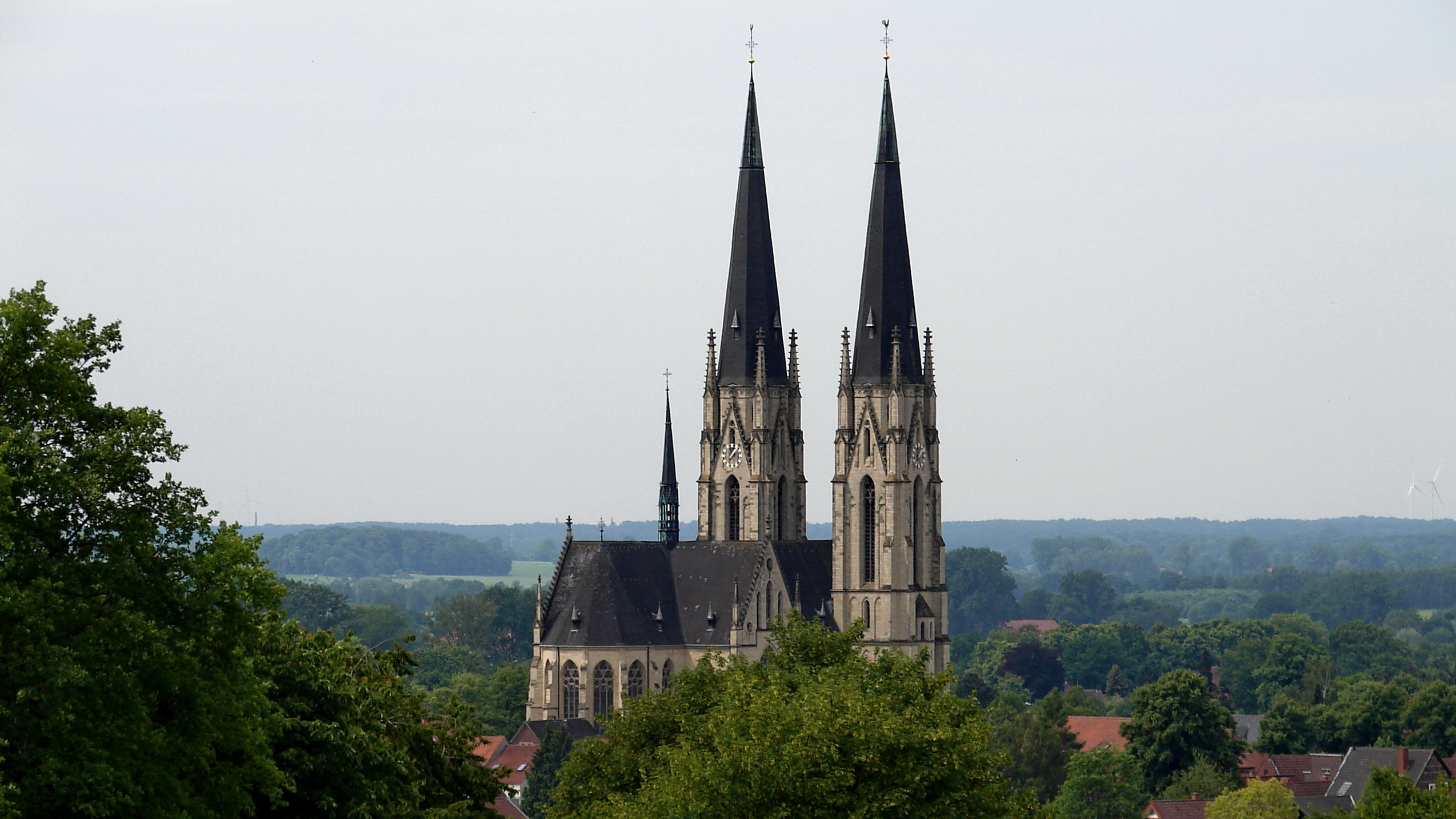
- St Luger's Church
- 51°58′40.16″N 7°17′29.96″E
- Location: Billerbeck, North Rhine-Westphalia
- Address: Kirchstraße 4
- Country: Germany
- Denomination: Roman Catholic
- Website: www.domsite-billerbeck.de

History
- Status: active
- Dedication: Ludger

Architecture
- Functional status: Pilgrimage church
- Heritage designation: Baudenkmal in North Rhine-Westphalia
- Designated: 20 March 1985
- Architect: Wilhelm Rincklake
- Architectural type: Hall church
- Style: Neo-Gothic
- Years built: 1892–1898

Specifications
- Capacity: 4000
- Length: 56 m (183 ft 9 in)
- Width: 26 m (85 ft 4 in)
- Height: 34 m (111 ft 7 in)
- Materials: Baumberger sandstone

Administration
- Diocese: Münster
- Parish: Parish and Provostry of St John and St Ludger

Clergy
- Pastor(s): Frank Ludger Bakenecker; David Vincent Stanislaus

St Ludger's Church, also called Ludger's Cathedral, is a Roman Catholic pilgrimage church in the city of Billerbeck in the Diocese of Münster and one of the two churches of the Parish and Provostry of St John and St Ludger. It is a neo-Gothic hall church with transepts.

Since 1985, the church has been a Baudenkmal of North Rhine-Westphalia, Billerbeck no. 11.

== History ==
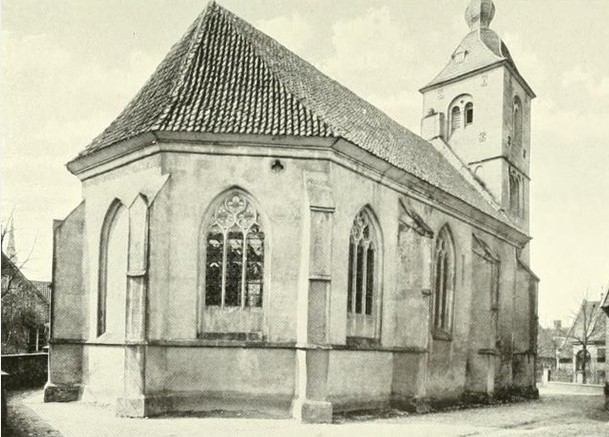
Old St. Ludger's Church, 1891

Bishop Ludger baptized at Billerbeck and founded the parish church of St John the Baptist there before 800. A chapel dedicated to the saint was built at the place of death or in its vicinity in the 11th century. It was probably dedicated to Ludger from its inception, and its secondary patron was St Nicholas of Myra. In the 15th century, this chapel was expanded in a Gothic style. Under Prince Bishop Christoph Bernhard von Galen (1650–1678), the tower was raised by one floor. Towards the end of the 19th century the building was demolished to make way for a new building.

Today's provost church was built in the years 1892–1898 on the foundations of the Romanesque Ludger Church and a funeral chapel erected around 1735 by master builder Wilhelm Rincklake (1851–1927). He designed the nave in the form of a basilica with a transept and the 100 m high pair of towers from the Baumberger sandstone found in the nearby Baumberge. The towers of the cathedral can be seen from afar.

The neo-Gothic Ludger Cathedral incorporated the site where St Ludger died. The place where the saint died in Billerbeck, along with his burial place in the Basilica of St Ludger in Essen, is one of the focal points of the veneration of St Ludger to this day. Billerbeck thus has both historical and spiritual significance for the entire diocese. The city is one of the three "high places" of the diocese.

At the inauguration of the church, Bishop Hermann Jakob Dingelstad said that he "has every right to call this important church the Ludger Cathedral." Since that time, the provost's church has also been referred to as the cathedral, although it is neither a cathedral nor bishop's seat.

Like the architect, the sculptors, carpenters, and glassmakers involved in the construction were inspired by medieval models and developed their approaches further; in this way they created a uniform ensemble from the body of the building to the furnishings.

With its silhouette and dimensions, St Ludger's Cathedral is a landmark of the city of Billerbeck that can be seen from afar.

== Façades ==
=== West Façade ===
The main portal is flanked by two figures: on the right Abbot Gregory of Utrecht, the teacher of Ludger in Utrecht, on the left St Nicholas, who was the patron saint of the earlier church on this site. A crucifixion group rises above a six-panel window in the gable. In the gable niche is a figure of St Ludger.

=== South Façade ===
It is dedicated to the Virgin Mary. Above the portal is a relief of the Annunciation. On the sides of the portal there are two sandstone figures of great Marian devotees: on the right Bernard of Clairvaux and on the left Herman Joseph von Steinfeld. These are copies. The two heavily weathered originals are currently being kept in the Sandstone Museum in Havixbeck, to protect from further deterioration. In the cross gable, Mary is depicted with the baby Jesus, surrounded by two angels.

At the end of the 100th anniversary of the cathedral, a memorial stone was erected on the south side of the cathedral at the end of 1998, which was designed by the painter and sculptor Mechthild Ammann from Billerbeck. Two highly polished stainless steel plates are embedded at eye level in this stone made of Baumberger sandstone, the material from which the cathedral was also built. Etched into the metal surfaces are sketches and scenes, texts and symbols that deal with the prehistory and with the construction of the cathedral itself.

== Interior ==
The central nave, aisle, and transepts are covered by cross-ribbed vaults. The central nave measures 22.5 meters from the floor to the keystone of the vault. The side aisles are 10 meters high. The ridge height of the roof is 34 meters. At the crossing, the vaulting becomes octopartite. The space can hold up to 4000 people.

=== East Window ===
The 15-meter-high, three-part east window contains the theme of the work of salvation, beginning with the expulsion of the first men after the Fall. They show numerous scenes from the Old and New Testaments. The two lower scenes of each window are taken from the Old Testament and typologically refer to the two upper New Testament scenes. In the middle, the only non-biblical scene, St Ludger is shown celebrating the Holy Mass one last time the day before his death. The image's presence at the centre of all the biblical images expresses that the celebration of Holy Mass keeps the whole work of God's redemption present to the church and to all people, which culminates in the sacrifice of Jesus on the cross.

The entire window cycle was made by the stained-glass workshop Anton von der Forst from Münster. The cartoons for the east windows are by Rafael Grünnes of Ried, Upper Austria.

=== Choir ===
In keeping with the architectural framing of the windows, the four evangelists are arranged in front of the four connected pillars. The twelve apostles were placed on the inside of the choir in the same way. A triumphal cross hangs from the choir arch, which has the symbols of the four evangelists at the ends. The Corpus Christi and the Evangelist symbols come from the Münster sculptor August Schmiemann.

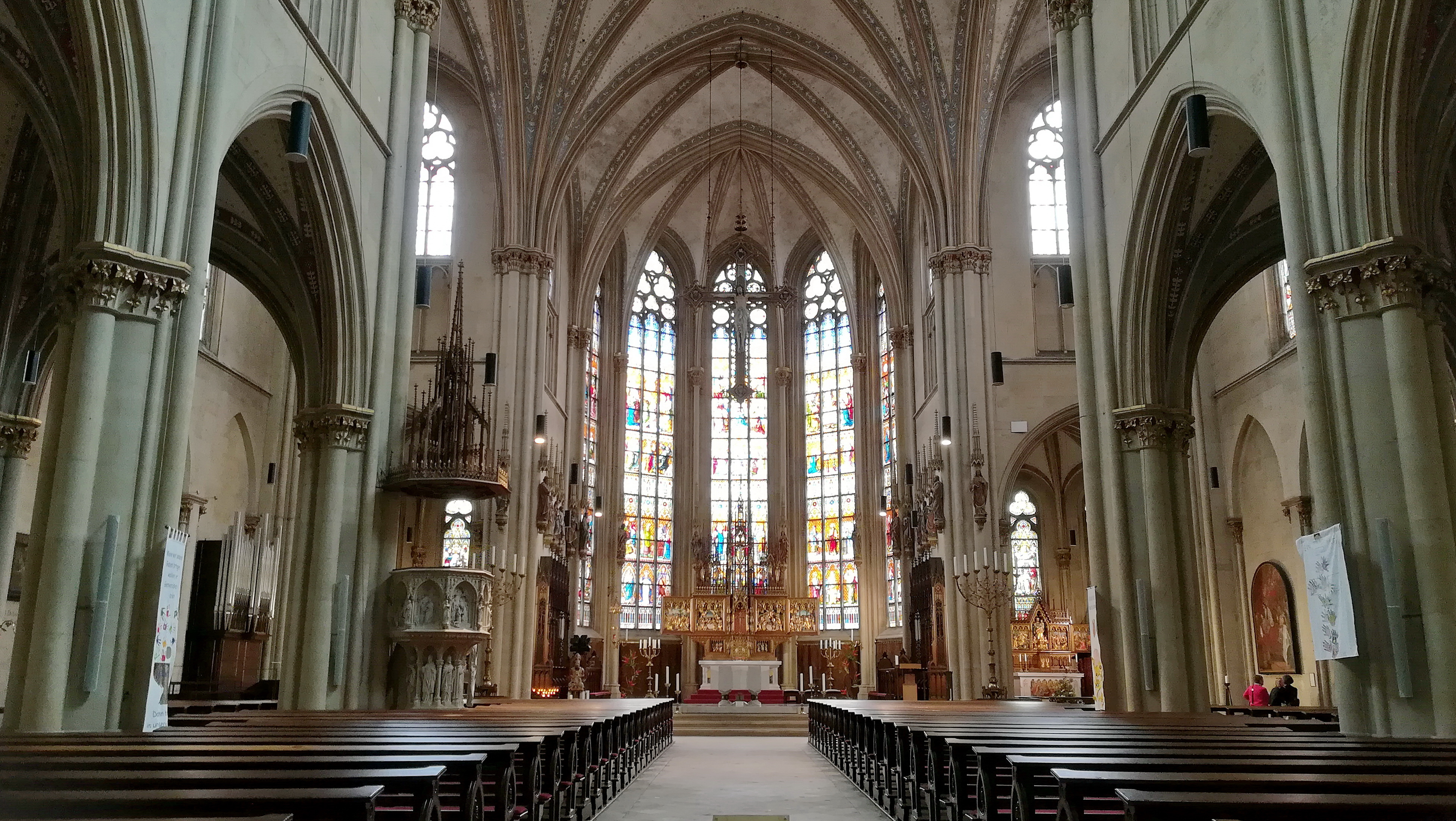
Interior of the church, facing East

The richly decorated pulpit made of Baumberger sandstone was made by the Münster sculptor Bernhard Frydag based on the designs of the architect, Wilhelm Rincklake. The five relief images refer to man's journey into the kingdom of God. They show scenes including the Baptism of the Gentiles by St. Ludger, the Parable of the Sower, the Parable of the Prodigal Son, as well as the Parable of the Rich Fool and the Rich Man and Lazarus. Statues of eight saints stand on the shaft of the pulpit.

=== Northeast Chapel ===
The north chapel's altarpiece is dedicated to the Blessed Mother. If the winged altar is open, you can see a statue of the Mother of God in the middle and angels to the left and right of her. On the wings of the altar are six paintings of saints: on the right wing Dominic, Heriburg of Nottuln, Bernard of Clairvaux; on the left wing Joachim, Anne, Simeon. When the altarpiece is closed, there is a painting of the Annunciation, with Ludger on the left and John on the right. The three windows of the choir illustrate scenes from the life of the Blessed Mother.

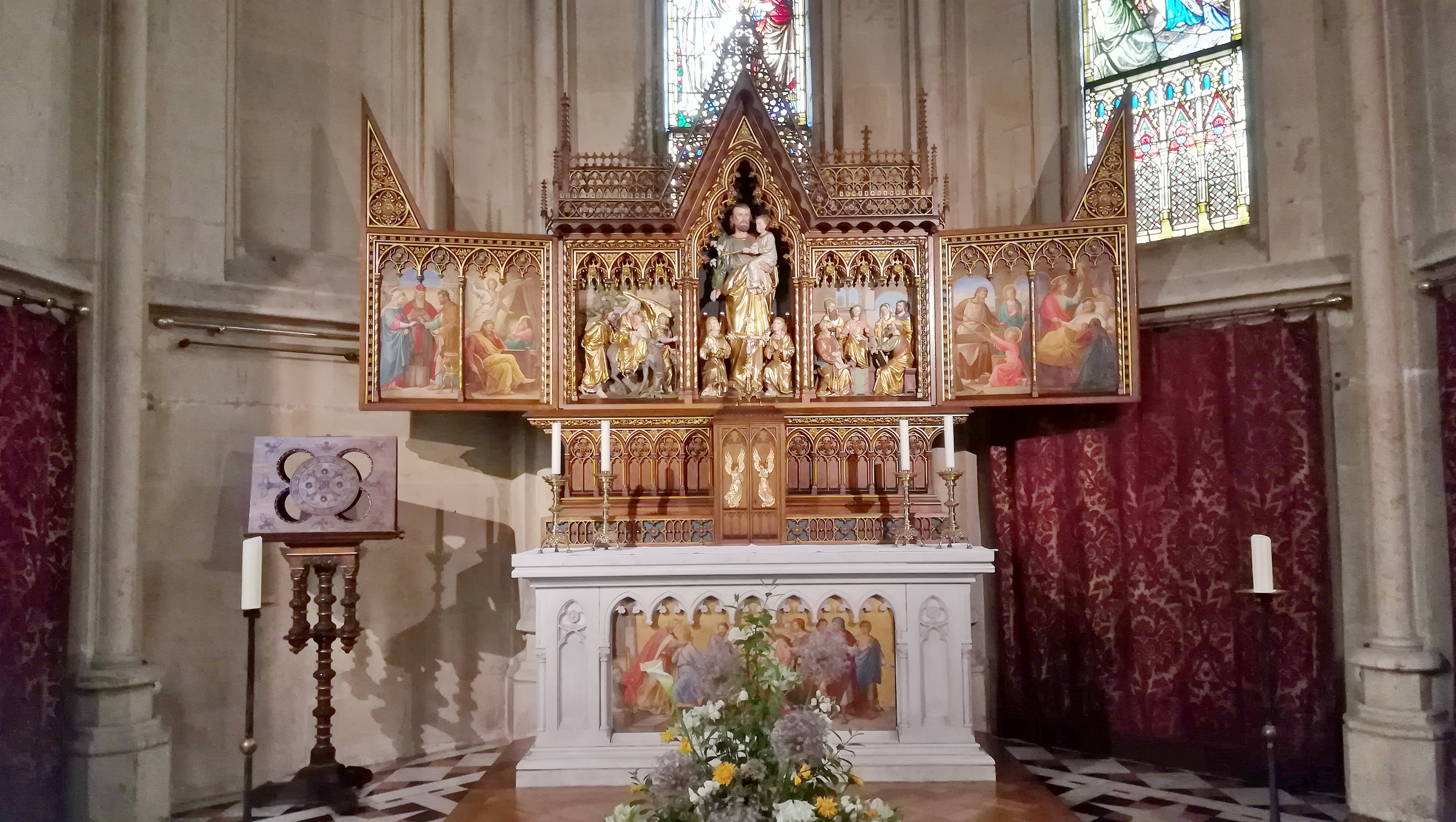
Altar of the southeast chapel

=== Southeast Chapel ===
The south chapel is dedicated to St Joseph, who can be seen with the baby Jesus when the altarpiece is open. To his right and left are paintings and reliefs related to the life of Joseph. When the piece is closed, depicts the elevation of Joseph to the patron saint of the Church by Pope Pius IX on 8 December 1870; to their right are Saints Francis de Sales, Alfonso de Liguori, and Hermann Joseph; to their left are Saints Thérèse of Lisieux, Bridget, and Blessed Mary of the Angels. The three windows show further scenes from the life of the saint.

Both side altars were designed by the architect Wilhelm Rincklake. The statues and reliefs were provided by the sculptor August Schmiemann (Münster). Decorative painter Hermann Schwarte (Oelde) carried out the polychromy. The paintings of both altars, as well as the high altar, were made by the history painter Carl Bertling (Dresden).

=== Transept and Aisle Windows ===
The windows of the south transept show various scenes depicting the church as a house of prayer: the Cleansing of the Temple, Christ in the House of Martha, the Mount of Olives, and the Transfiguration. The windows of the north transept depict scenes under the theme of "the foundation of the Church through Christ": the Sermon on the Mount, the Pentecost sermon of St Peter, the Promise to Peter, and the Injunction to St Peter "Feed My Sheep."

The aisle windows depict saints who have a close connection to the Diocese of Münster. The south side depicts Paul the Apostle, Boniface, Swithbert alongside Heriburg of Nottuln, and the two Ewalds; the north side depicts Willibrord together with Viktor of Xanten, Ida of Herzfeld with Thiathild of Freckenhorst, and Norbert of Xanten with Gottfried of Cappenberg. The window of the west façade depicts the patron saints of church music: Cecilia of Rome and Pope Gregory the Great.

The clerestory windows contain carpet patterns.

== Tower Chapels ==
=== South Tower Chapel ===
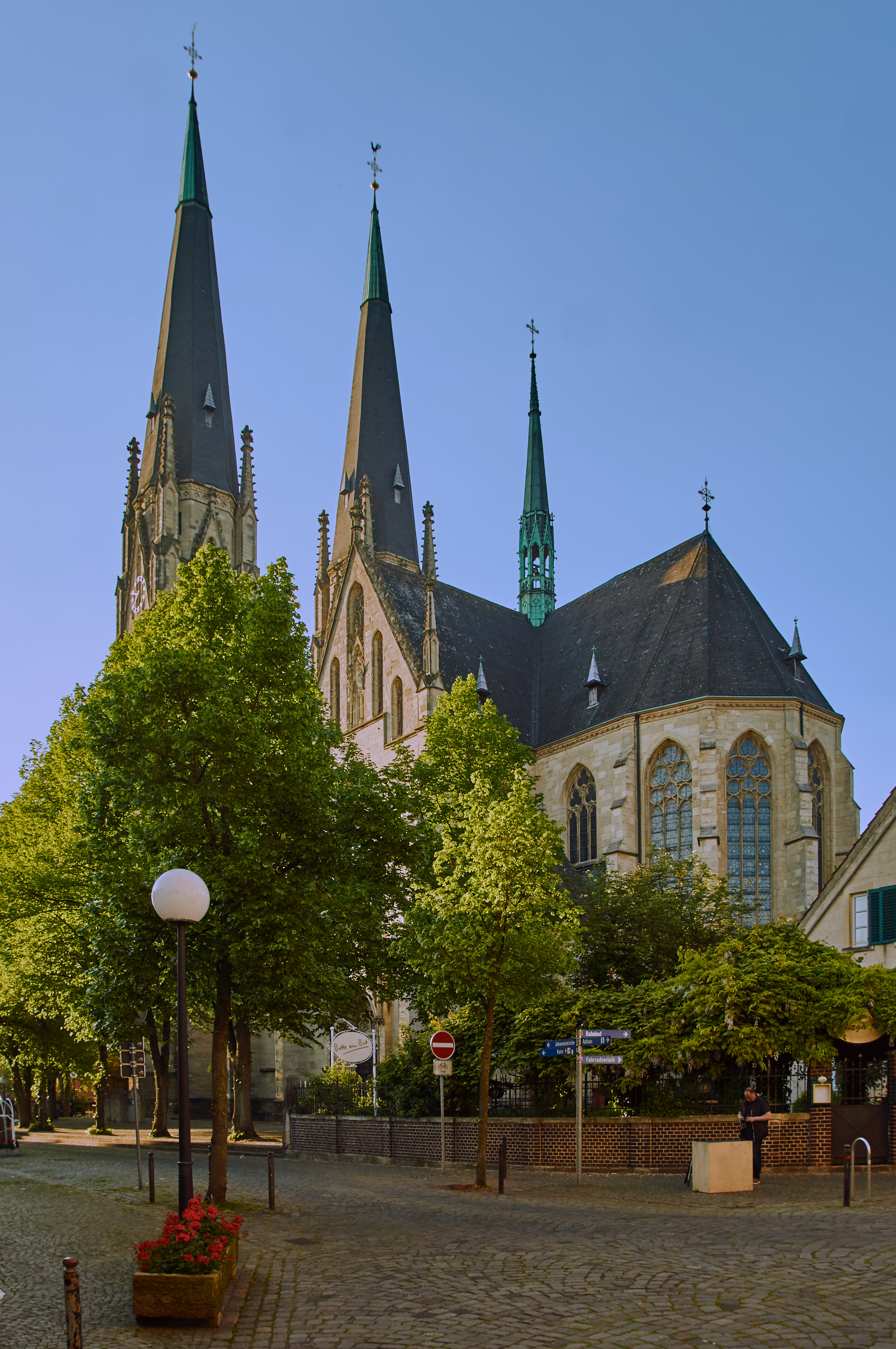
Exterior of the church from the southeast

The main destination of the pilgrims who make the pilgrimage to Billerbeck is the funeral chapel in the south tower. It is a quiet place of prayer where, according to tradition, the houses where Ludger died stood. The view falls on the bright altar, which stands out against the dark floor. The Carrara marble altarpiece depicts the death of St Ludger among his brothers. Under the altar slab there is a monstrance with relics of the saint in an illuminated niche. The relic, the saint's right foot, was presented to the Billerbeck pastor Hennewig in St Ludger's Church in Münster on 17 June 1860 by the then-Vicar-General Johann Bernhard Brinkmann (later Confessor Bishop).

On either side of the altarpiece are figures bearing symbols of the divine virtues and cardinal virtues: cross (faith), anchor (hope), heart (love), blindfolded and scales (justice), book and snake (prudence), overturned vessel (moderation), sword (bravery).

The upper part of the west window in the chapel shows the transfer of the bones to Werden and below Ludger praying and how, according to legend, a messenger calls him to Charlemagne.

The window above the altar depicts the legend of how Gerfried and Heriburg, the saint's nephew and sister, learned of Ludger's death through a light signal from heaven. In the picture above, Ludger is shown surrounded by four angels with the episcopal insignia.

The tapestry in front of the funeral chapel is a reminder that the previous church at this location was dedicated to St Nicholas.

=== North Tower Chapel ===
There is a memorial to the over 300 people who died in the Second World War from Billerbeck. The names are immortalized on simple wooden crosses. The plaque hanging at the entrance lists the more than 100 people missing from the war. Between these crosses there is a replica of the Pietà by Wilhelm Achtermann, which stood in Münster Cathedral and was destroyed by bombs during World War II. The sculptor Bernhard Meyer from Billerbeck created this work. The donor of the replica, which was erected on 16 December 1937, was a citizen of Billerbeck.

== Notes ==
Her first name can be written: "Thiathild," "Thiatildis," or "Diethild."
