= Derick Baegert =

German painter

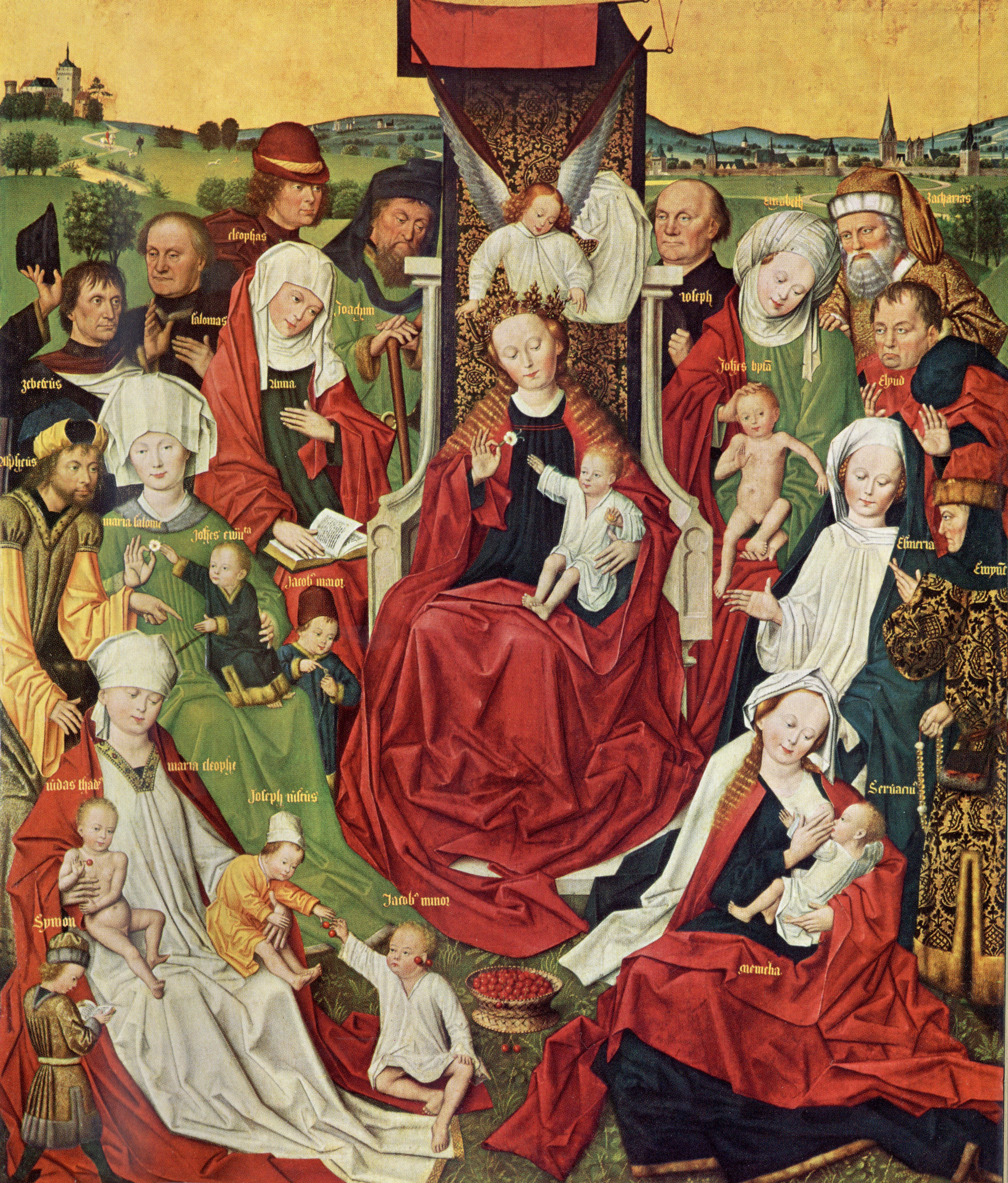
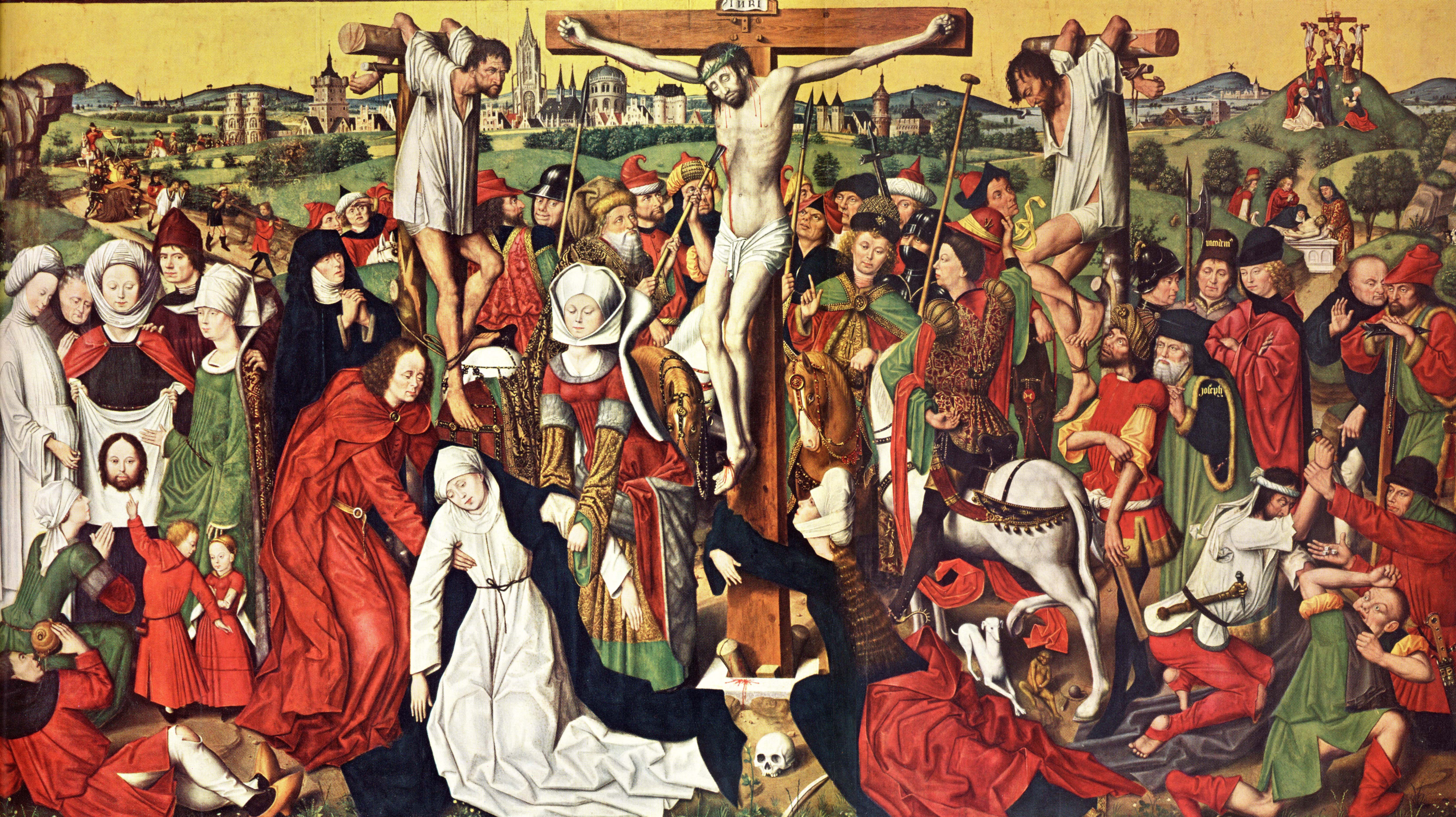
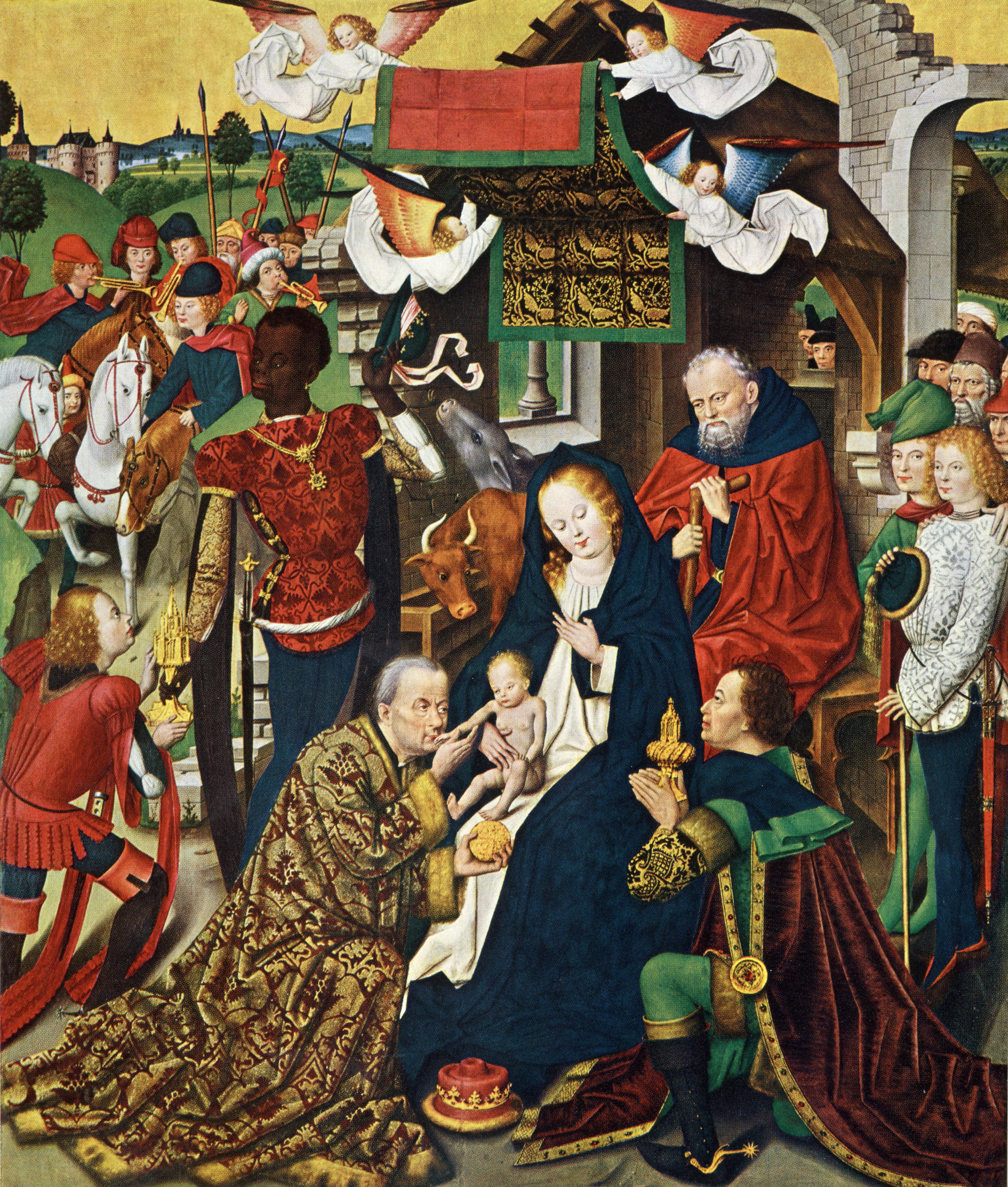
Altar triptych from the Propsteikirche in Dortmund

Derik or Derick Baegert (c. 1440 – after 1515) was a German late Gothic painter.

== Life ==
Derick Baegert was probably born in Wesel around 1435-1440 to Johan Baegert, a merchant, and Mechtelt Mynreman. While his family wasn't very wealthy, Derick ended his life as one of the richer people of Wesel, living in a grand house on the Brückstrasse in the old town of Wesel. Painter Jan Baegert, in earlier literature named the Master of Cappenberg, was his son, and Jan Joest, who may have been his nephew, and the Master of the Schermbecker Altar were probably some of his pupils.

Apart from some works for the city and churches of Wesel (including the retable for the Mathenachurch, largely destroyed in the Second World War), he also painted large altarpieces for churches like the Propsteichurch in Dortmund, and works for private devotion.

== Gallery ==
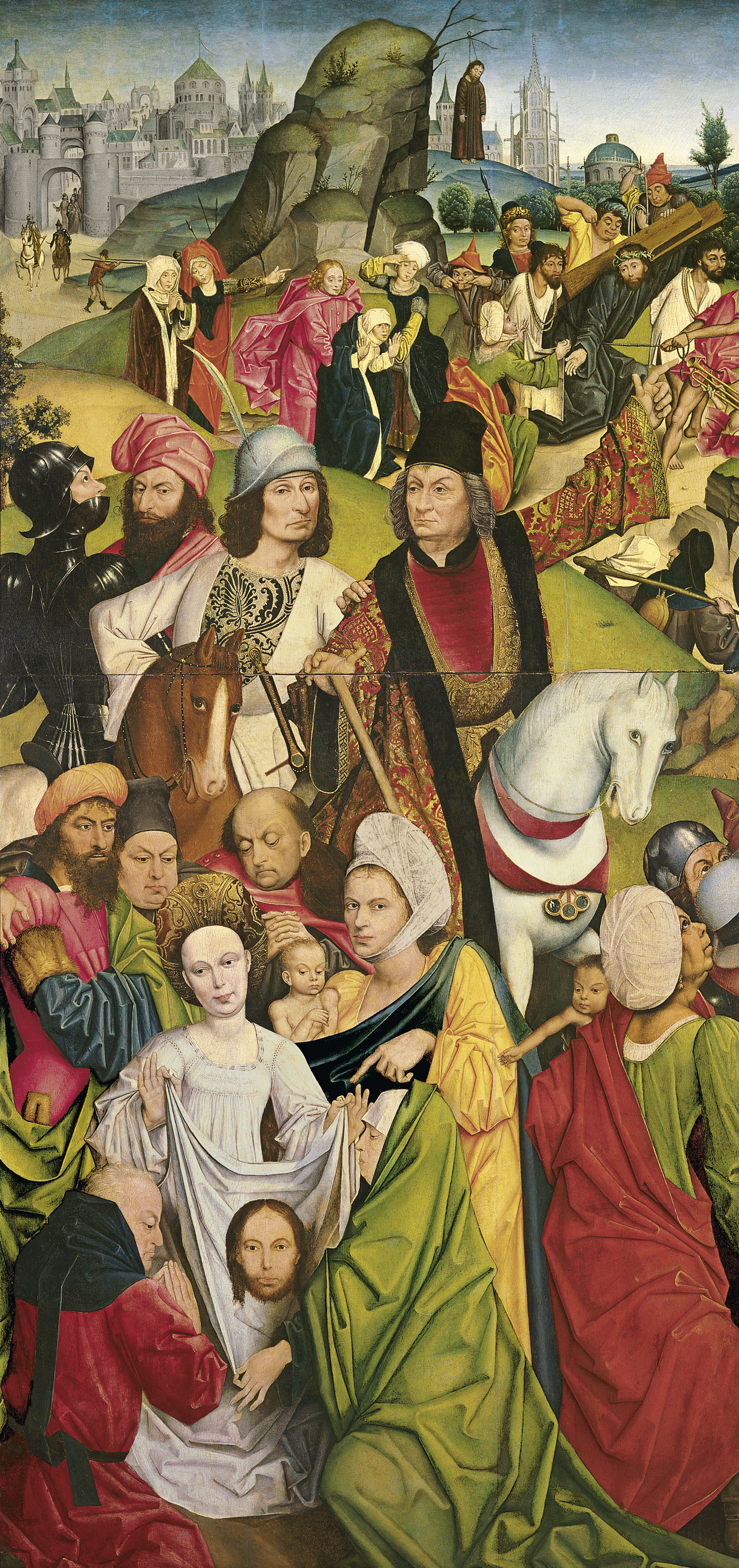
Christ Carrying the Cross and Veronica with the Sudarium, 1477-1478, Thyssen-Bornemisza Museum, Madrid

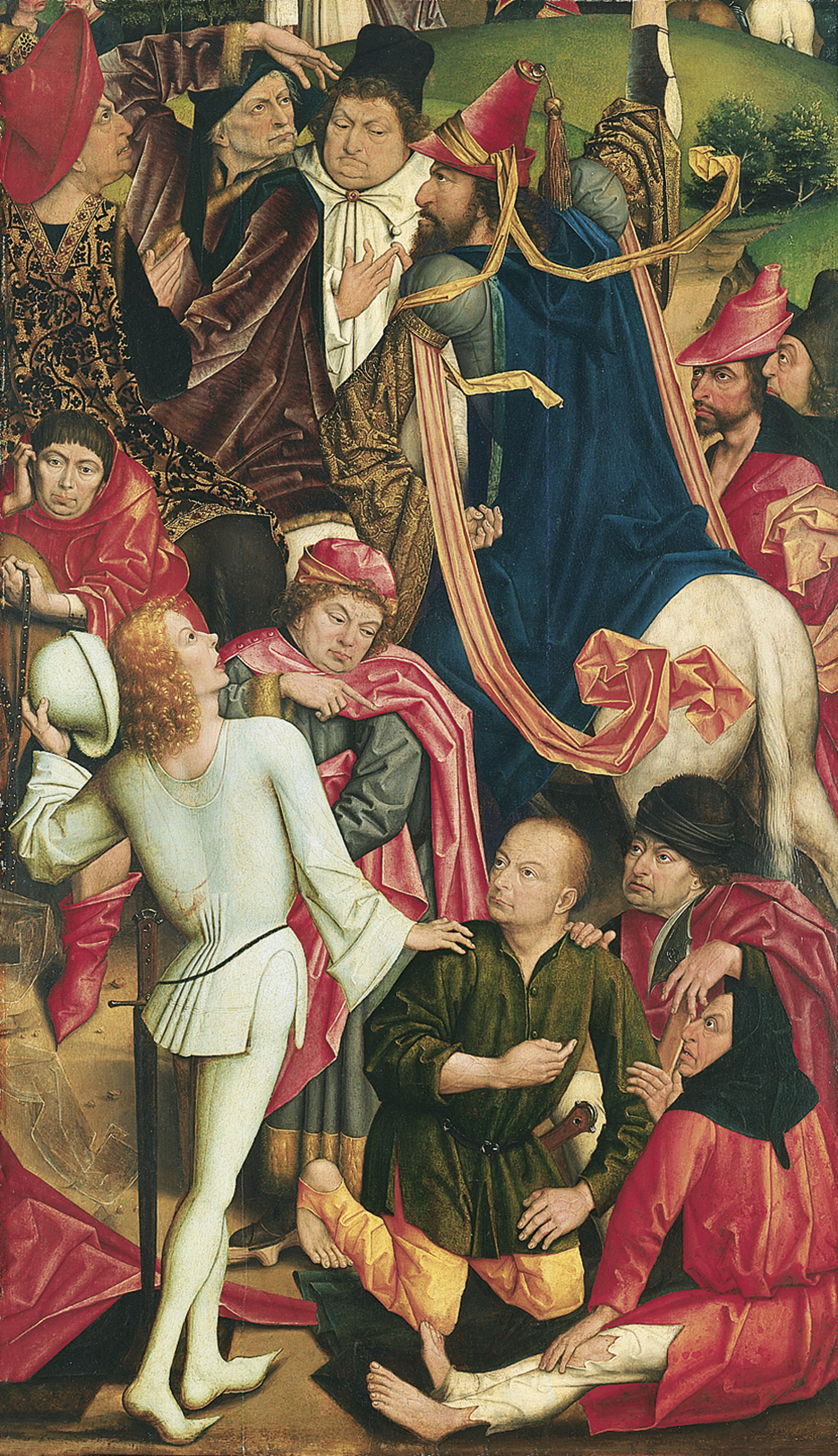
Knights and Soldiers playing Dice for Christ's Robe, part of the polyptych in the Thyssen-Bornemisza Museum

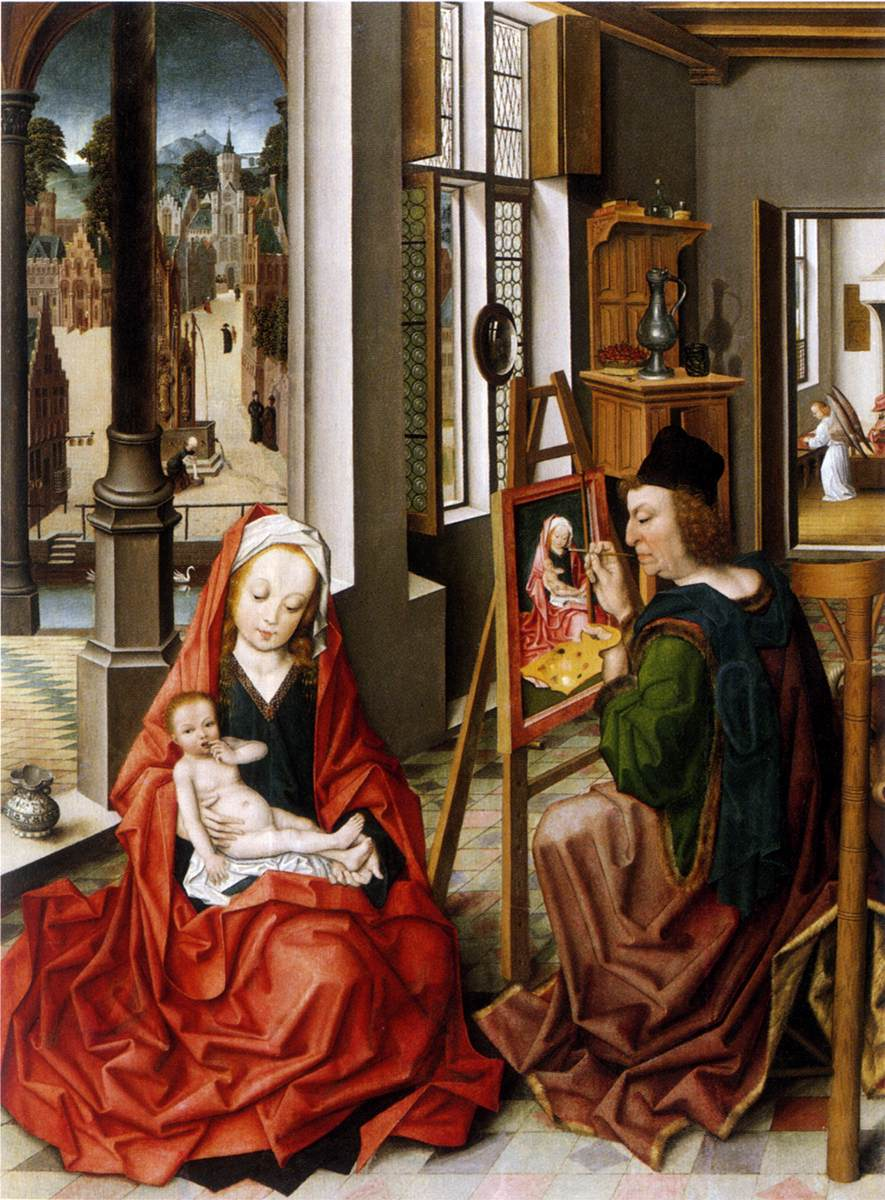
Saint Luke Painting the Virgin, ca. 1470, Westfalisches Landesmuseum, Münster

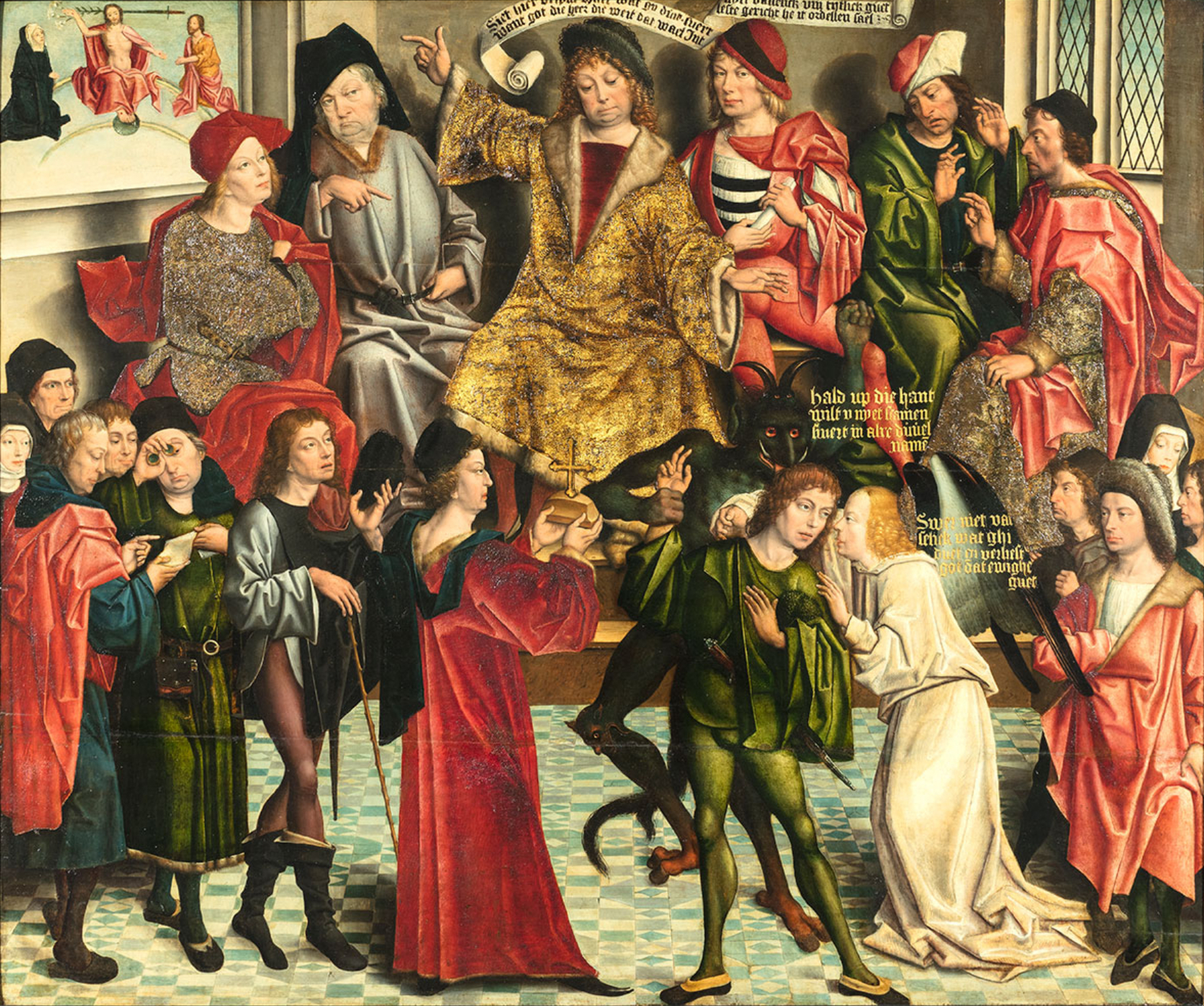
Oath taking in courtroom, 1493/94, Städtische Museum Wesel

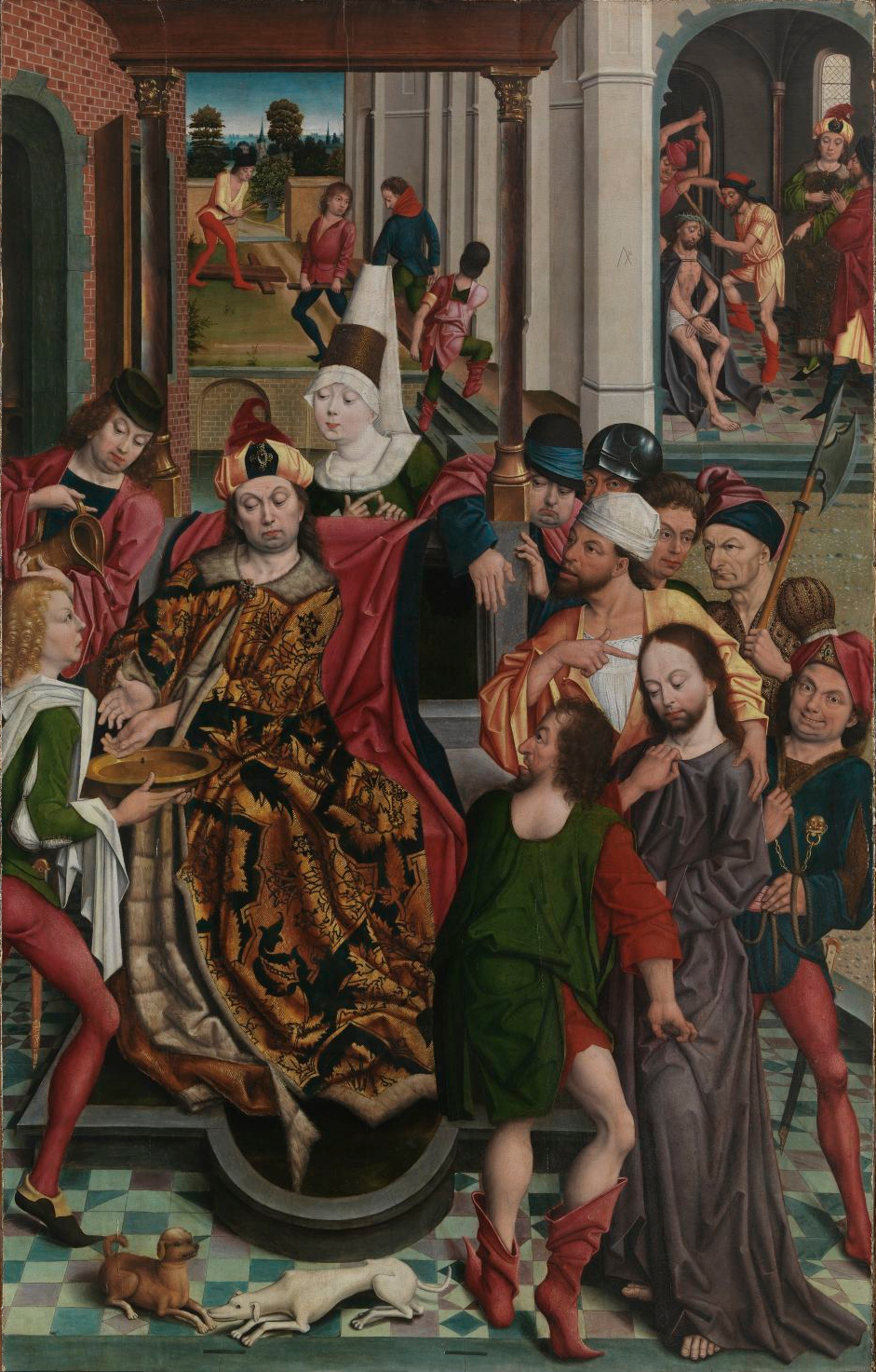
Washing the hands of Pilatus, Germanisches Nationalmuseum, Nuremberg

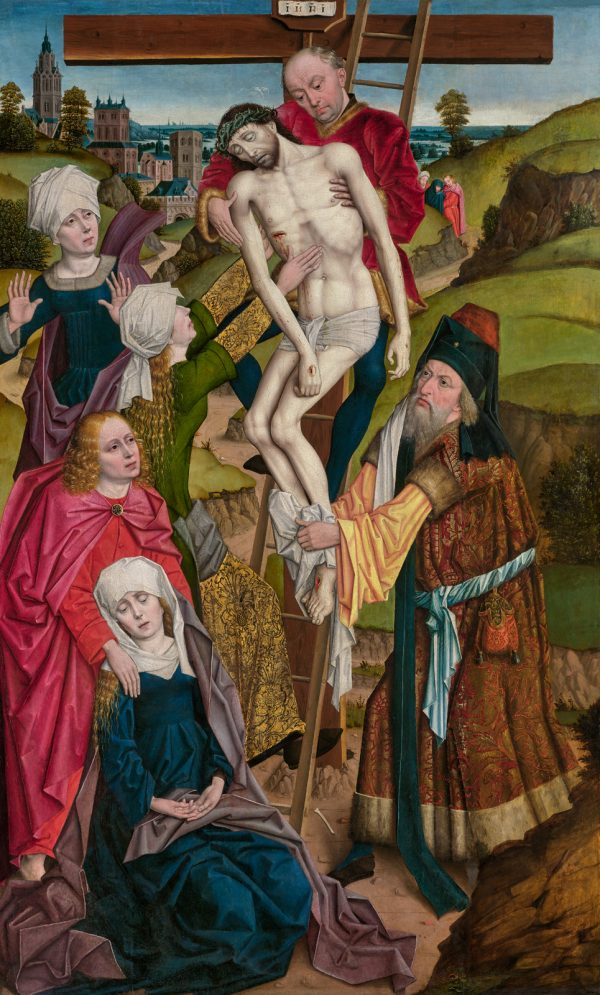
Descent from the Cross, in the Dallas Museum of Art
