= 1988–89 County Championship =

47th season of the Liga IV, the fourth tier of the Romanian football league

Liga IV
- Season: 1988–89

The 1988–89 County Championship was the 47th season of the Liga IV, the fourth tier of the Romanian football league system. The champions of each county association play against one from a neighboring county in a playoff to gain promotion.

== County championships ==
- Alba (AB)
- Arad (AR)
- Argeș (AG)
- Bacău (BC)
- Bihor (BH)
- Bistrița-Năsăud (BN)
- Botoșani (BT)
- Brașov (BV)
- Brăila (BR)
- Bucharest (B)
- Buzău (BZ)
- Caraș-Severin (CS)
- Călărași (CL)
- Cluj (CJ)
- Constanța (CT)
- Covasna (CV)
- Dâmbovița (DB)
- Dolj (DJ)
- Galați (GL)
- Giurgiu (GR)
- Gorj (GJ)
- Harghita (HR)
- Hunedoara (HD)
- Ialomița (IL)
- Iași (IS)
- Ilfov (IF)
- Maramureș (MM)
- Mehedinți (MH)
- Mureș (MS)
- Neamț (NT)
- Olt (OT)
- Prahova (PH)
- Satu Mare (SM)
- Sălaj (SJ)
- Sibiu (SB)
- Suceava (SV)
- Teleorman (TR)
- Timiș (TM)
- Tulcea (TL)
- Vaslui (VS)
- Vâlcea (VL)
- Vrancea (VN)

== Promotion play-off ==
Teams promoted to Divizia C without a play-off matches as teams from less represented counties in the third division.

- (IL) Rapid Fetești
- (TR) Dunărea Zimnicea
- (VL) Metalul Râmnicu Vâlcea
- (BT) Electro Botoșani
- (MH) CSM Drobeta-Turnu Severin
- (GR) Rapid Braniștea
- (AB) Soda Ocna Mureș

Preliminary round

Team 1	Agg.	Team 2	1st leg	2nd leg
Chiajna (IF)	2–4	(B) Mecos București	0–0	2–4

The matches was played on 2 and 6 August 1989.

Team 1	Agg.	Team 2	1st leg	2nd leg
Minerul Câmpulung (AG)	0–9	(OT) Spicul Coteana	0–5	0–4
Voința Negrești-Oaș (SM)	5–2	(MM) Voința Târgu Lăpuș	4–1	1–1
Rafinorul Ploiești (PH)	3–3 (Note: Carpați Nehoiu won on the away goals rule.)	(BZ) Carpați Nehoiu	3–1	0–2
Tricotex Panciu (VN)	6–1	(VS) Olimpia Stănilești	4–0	2–1
Mecos București (B)	4–3	(CL) Înainte Modelu	3–0	1–3
Constructorul Anina (CS)	3–6	(TM) Ceramica Jimbolia	2–0	1–6
Minerul Ștei (BH)	1–0	(AR) Victoria Ineu	1–0	0–0
Voința Roman (NT)	3–4	(HR) Mureșul Toplița	3–1	0–3
Minerul Rodna (BN)	4–4 (Note: Minerul Crucea won on the away goals rule.)	(SV) Minerul Crucea	4–1	0–3
Letea Bacău (BC)	2–4	(IS) Tepro Iași	2–1	0–3
Razelm Unirea Jurilovca (TL)	3–4	(GL) Gloria Ivești	2–2	1–2
Voința Constanța (CT)	3–5	(BR) Chimia Brăila	2–1	1–4
Jiul IEELIF Craiova (DJ)	1–2	(DB) Chimia Găești	1–2	0–0
Transportul Târgu Mureș (MS)	4–8	(SB) Metalul-Voința Sibiu	2–3	2–5
Silvania Cehu Siivaniei (SJ)	2–4	(CJ) Unirea Dej	2–2	0–2
Dacia Orăștie (HD)	6–3	(GJ) Avântul Baia de Fier	5–1	1–2
IPT Întorsura Buzăului (CV)	0–4	(BV) Metrom Brașov	0–0	0–4

== Championships standings ==
=== Arad County ===
Pos	Team	Pld	W	D	L	GF	GA	GD	Pts	Qualification or relegation
1	Victoria Ineu (C, Q)	40	28	4	8	92	42	+50	60	Qualification to promotion play-off
2	CFR Arad	40	25	6	9	96	43	+53	56	
3	Victoria Nădlac	40	21	8	11	71	52	+19	50	
4	Unirea Șofronea	40	20	9	11	90	55	+35	49	
5	Frontiera Curtici	40	18	6	16	65	63	+2	42	
6	Crișana Sebiș	40	17	8	15	58	68	−10	42	
7	Victoria Felnac	40	16	9	15	55	54	+1	41	
8	Explormin Hălmagiu	40	19	3	18	52	65	−13	41	
9	Metalul Ineu	40	17	6	17	69	60	+9	40	
10	Progresul Pecica	40	16	8	16	66	63	+3	40	
11	Stăruința Dorobanți	40	16	8	16	62	60	+2	40	
12	Olimpia ISD Arad	40	17	6	17	64	70	−6	40	
13	Mureșul Zădăreni	40	18	3	19	80	71	+9	39	
14	Gloria Arad	40	16	7	17	47	47	0	39	
15	Banatul Vinga	40	17	5	18	47	55	−8	39	
16	Vânători	40	16	7	17	61	70	−9	39	
17	Șiriana Șiria (R)	40	16	6	18	64	69	−5	38	Relegation to Liga V Arad
18	Tractorul Satu Nou (R)	40	16	6	18	69	77	−8	38	Relegation to Liga V Arad
19	Foresta Sânpetru German (R)	40	14	4	22	57	95	−38	32	Relegation to Liga V Arad
20	Mecanica Pădureni (R)	40	7	7	26	33	84	−51	21	Relegation to Liga V Arad
21	Victoria Ceasuri Arad (R)	40	4	6	30	22	80	−58	14	Relegation to Liga V Arad

Rules for classification: 1) Points; 2) Goal difference; 3) Number of goals scored.
(C) Champions; (Q) Qualified for the phase indicated; (R) Relegated

=== Bihor County ===
Pos	Team	Pld	W	D	L	GF	GA	GD	Pts	Qualification or relegation
1	Minerul Ștei (C, Q)	32	25	3	4	91	18	+73	53	Qualification to promotion play-off
2	Stăruința Săcuieni	32	23	3	6	102	31	+71	49	
3	Olimpia Salonta	32	22	4	6	74	25	+49	48	
4	Minerul Voivozi	32	15	7	10	69	40	+29	37	
5	Biharea Vașcău	32	15	6	11	54	44	+10	36	
6	Metalica Oradea	32	14	6	12	47	23	+24	34	
7	IAMT Oradea	32	16	2	14	45	39	+6	34	
8	Bihoreana Marghita	32	13	7	12	56	38	+18	33	
9	Unirea Valea lui Mihai	32	15	5	12	58	50	+8	32 (Note: Unirea Valea lui Mihai deducted 3 points.)	
10	Recolta Diosig	32	13	4	15	62	61	+1	30	
11	Victoria Avram Iancu	32	12	4	16	52	51	+1	28	
12	Victoria Tulca	32	13	2	17	59	70	−11	28	
13	Lotus Băile Felix	32	11	4	17	43	65	−22	26	
14	Petrolul IMU Marghita	32	7	9	16	30	57	−27	23	
15	Crișana Tinca	32	9	4	19	40	81	−41	22	
16	Stînca Vadu Crișului	32	12	1	19	37	91	−54	21 (Note: Stînca Vadu Crișului deducted 4 points.)	
17	Sticla Pădurea Neagră	32	1	1	30	15	150	−135	3	

Rules for classification: 1) Points; 2) Goal difference; 3) Number of goals scored.
(C) Champions; (Q) Qualified for the phase indicated

=== Bucharest ===
The ranking combined points of the senior (3 points for a win) and junior (2 points for a win) teams.

Pos	Team	Pld	W	D	L	GF	GA	GD	Pts	Qualification or relegation
1	Mecos București (C, Q)	76	49	11	16	185	90	+95	134	Qualification to promotion play-off
2	Șoimii IMUC București	76	45	9	22	129	92	+37	118	
3	Voința București	76	42	13	21	134	68	+66	114	
4	ICME București	76	39	17	20	130	72	+58	112	
5	Mașini Unelte București	76	36	16	24	107	87	+20	106	
6	Calculatorul București	76	36	12	28	116	84	+32	104	
7	Vulcan București	76	33	15	28	119	110	+9	98	
8	Laromet București	76	32	17	28	120	94	+26	97	
9	Gloria București	76	32	9	35	102	114	−12	90	
10	Aversa București	76	33	8	35	141	125	+16	89	
11	IAB Pantelimon	76	31	12	33	117	104	+13	88	
12	Granitul București	76	31	9	36	105	118	−13	87	
13	Electroaparataj București	76	32	6	38	100	110	−10	86	
14	URBIS București	76	27	12	37	103	125	−22	86	
15	Electromagnetica București	76	30	11	35	105	126	−21	85	
16	Electra București	76	27	18	31	95	129	−34	84	
17	Flacăra Roșie București	76	27	17	32	109	131	−22	83	
18	Prefabricate București	76	22	11	43	69	141	−72	71	
19	Automecanica București	76	21	11	44	96	149	−53	65	
20	Diamantul București	76	14	10	52	70	183	−113	42	

Rules for classification: 1) Points; 2) Goal difference; 3) Number of goals scored.
(C) Champion; (Q) Qualified for the phase indicated

=== Covasna County ===
Pos	Team	Pld	W	D	L	GF	GA	GD	Pts	Qualification or relegation
1	IPT Întorsura Buzăului (C, Q)	36	30	4	2	165	27	+138	64	Qualification to promotion play-off
2	IMP Sfântu Gheorghe	36	30	3	3	119	28	+91	63	
3	Avântul Catalina	36	21	4	11	114	65	+49	46	
4	Stăruința Bodoc	36	20	6	10	76	49	+27	46	
5	Stăruința Zagon	36	20	4	12	111	66	+45	44	
6	Constructorul Sfântu Gheorghe	36	17	7	12	85	60	+25	41	
7	Perkő Sânzieni	36	17	5	14	82	67	+15	39	
8	ICB Malnaș	36	17	1	18	72	78	−6	35	
9	Tatra Brăduț	36	15	5	16	73	83	−10	35	
10	IMASA Sfântu Gheorghe II	36	14	4	18	82	76	+6	32	
11	Spartacus Hăghig	35	14	3	18	88	101	−13	31	
12	Victoria Ozun	35	12	7	16	76	90	−14	31	
13	Harghita Aita Mare	36	13	5	18	55	95	−40	31	
14	Recolta Moacșa	36	13	4	19	69	103	−34	30	
15	Unirea Reci	36	13	3	20	63	87	−24	29	
16	Diatomita Filia	36	11	6	19	84	96	−12	28	
17	Recolta Ojdula	35	10	6	19	56	78	−22	26	
18	Partizanul Păpăuți	35	10	1	24	67	141	−74	21	
19	Recolta Tamașfalău (Note: Recolta Tamașfalău was excluded from the championship after 21 rounds for repeated no-shows-up and lost all remaining matches with 0–3.) (D)	36	3	2	31	19	135	−116	8	Excluded

Rules for classification: 1) Points; 2) Goal difference; 3) Number of goals scored.
(C) Champions; (D) Disqualified; (Q) Qualified for the phase indicated

=== Harghita County ===
Pos	Team	Pld	W	D	L	GF	GA	GD	Pts	Qualification or relegation
1	Mureșul Toplița (C, Q)	26	21	3	2	95	15	+80	45	Qualification to promotion play-off
2	Metalul Vlăhița	26	19	2	5	87	34	+53	40	
3	Mureșul Suseni	26	16	4	6	66	22	+44	36	
4	Avicola Cristuru Secuiesc	26	15	3	8	69	44	+25	33	
5	Făgetul Borsec	26	14	3	9	58	36	+22	31	
6	Complexul Gălăuțaș	26	13	3	10	47	38	+9	29	
7	Tractorul Miercurea Ciuc	26	12	1	13	51	41	+10	25	
8	Unirea Hodoșa	26	10	3	13	40	50	−10	23	
9	Mobila Ditrău	26	8	6	12	33	55	−22	22	
10	Stăruința Praid	26	8	4	14	43	63	−20	20	
11	Bastionul Lăzarea	26	8	4	14	33	62	−29	20	
12	Minerul Tulgheș	26	4	8	14	25	79	−54	16	
13	Viață Nouă Remetea	26	7	1	18	32	82	−50	15	
14	Constructorul Miercurea Ciuc	26	2	5	19	24	82	−58	9	

Rules for classification: 1) Points; 2) Goal difference; 3) Number of goals scored.
(C) Champions; (Q) Qualified for the phase indicated

=== Hunedoara County ===
Pos	Team	Pld	W	D	L	GF	GA	GD	Pts	Qualification or relegation
1	Dacia Orăștie (C, Q)	32	25	4	3	116	26	+90	54	Qualification to promotion play-off
2	Victoria Călan	32	25	2	5	96	24	+72	52	
3	Minerul Uricani	32	24	0	8	78	24	+54	48	
4	Minerul Ghelari	32	22	4	6	64	24	+40	48	
5	Minerul Certej	32	16	7	9	75	41	+34	39	
6	Minerul Aninoasa	32	16	7	9	62	37	+25	39	
7	Metalul Crișcior	32	18	3	11	72	56	+16	39	
8	Parângul Lonea	32	16	5	11	87	57	+30	37	
9	Utilajul Petroșani	32	17	3	12	65	55	+10	37	
10	Constructorul Hunedoara	32	16	4	12	83	57	+26	34 (Note: Constructorul Hunedoara deducted 2 points.)	
11	Inox Hunedoara	32	9	4	19	44	68	−24	22	
12	Preparatorul Petrila	32	9	2	21	42	89	−47	20	
13	EGCL Călan	32	8	2	22	42	81	−39	18	
14	Rapid Simeria Triaj	32	9	0	23	42	95	−53	18	
15	Mecanizatorul Sântandrei	32	6	5	21	40	92	−52	17	
16	CFR Petroșani	32	6	0	26	26	106	−80	12	
17	Voința SMA Ilia	32	3	2	27	25	127	−102	8	
18	Mureșul Geoagiu (Note: Mureșul Geoagiu was excluded after 12 rounds for disciplinary violations at the match with Mecanizatorul Sântandrei and all its results were canceled.) (D)	0	0	0	0	0	0	0	0	Excluded

Rules for classification: 1) Points; 2) Goal difference; 3) Number of goals scored.
(C) Champions; (D) Disqualified; (Q) Qualified for the phase indicated

=== Maramureș County ===
Pos	Team	Pld	W	D	L	GF	GA	GD	Pts	Qualification or relegation
1	Voința Târgu Lăpuș (C, Q)	22	15	3	4	61	12	+49	33	Qualification to promotion play-off
2	Minerul Băiuț	22	17	1	4	69	12	+57	29	
3	Tractorul Satulung	22	11	2	9	32	39	−7	24	
4	IS Sighetu Marmației	22	10	3	9	36	38	−2	23	
5	Unirea Seini	22	10	2	10	41	35	+6	22	
6	Antena Baia Mare	22	9	4	9	41	35	+6	22	
7	Viitorul Ocna Șugatag	22	9	2	11	32	45	−13	20	
8	Maramureșana Sighetu Marmației	22	7	5	10	32	27	+5	19	
9	Bradul Vișeu de Sus II	22	8	3	11	31	46	−15	19	
10	Progresul Șomcuta Mare	22	7	4	11	33	55	−22	18	
11	Metalul Bogdan Vodă (R)	22	8	2	12	30	53	−23	18 (Note: Minerul Băiuț deducted 6 points.)	Relegation to Liga V Maramureș
12	Sticla Ulmeni (R)	22	4	3	15	27	68	−41	11	Relegation to Liga V Maramureș

Rules for classification: 1) Points; 2) Goal difference; 3) Number of goals scored.
(C) Champions; (Q) Qualified for the phase indicated; (R) Relegated

=== Mureș County ===
Pos	Team	Pld	W	D	L	GF	GA	GD	Pts	Qualification or relegation
1	Transportul Târgu Mureș (C, Q)	28	18	5	5	57	22	+35	41	Qualification to promotion play-off
2	Gaz Metan Târgu Mureș	28	14	9	5	50	22	+28	37	
3	Sticla Târnăveni	28	17	3	8	56	35	+21	37	
4	IRA Târgu Mureș	28	15	6	7	56	27	+29	36	
5	Faianța Sighișoara	28	14	4	10	44	37	+7	32	
6	Avântul Târgu Mureș	28	10	8	10	40	31	+9	28	
7	Energia Iernut	28	12	4	12	41	39	+2	28	
8	IMATEX Târgu Mureș	28	10	8	10	36	38	−2	28	
9	Piscicola Zau de Câmpie	28	12	2	14	46	53	−7	26	
10	Voința Sângeorgiu de Pădure	28	10	5	13	39	46	−7	25	
11	Voința Miercurea Nirajului	28	9	6	13	34	36	−2	24	
12	Voința Sărmașu	28	10	4	14	45	52	−7	24	
13	Voința Auto Târnăveni	28	9	5	14	36	55	−19	23	
14	Viitorul Prodcomplex Târgu Mureș	28	9	2	17	39	50	−11	20	
15	Valea Mureșului Gornești	28	4	3	21	17	93	−76	11	

Rules for classification: 1) Points; 2) Goal difference; 3) Number of goals scored.
(C) Champions; (Q) Qualified for the phase indicated

=== Prahova County ===
Teams changes from previous season

Relegated from Divizia C

- Carpați Sinaia

Promoted to Divizia C

- Metalul IUM Filipeștii de Pădure

Promoted from Prahova County Championship II

- Viitorul AEI Urlați
  (Urlați Territorial Championship and play-off winners)
- ASA Băicoi
  (Câmpina Territorial Championship and play-off winners)

Relegated to Prahova County Championship II

- Progresul Ploiești (17th place)
- Cristalul Azuga (18th place)

Other changes

- Viitorul AEI Urlați was renamed as AEI Urlați.
- ASA Băicoi was renamed as Vulturul Băicoi.

Pos	Team	Pld	W	D	L	GF	GA	GD	Pts	Qualification or relegation
1	Rafinorul Ploiești (C, Q)	34	22	5	7	65	29	+36	71	Qualification to promotion play-off
2	Carpați Sinaia	34	20	5	9	59	27	+32	65	
3	Oțelul Câmpina	34	16	9	9	44	30	+14	57	
4	Geamul Scăeni	34	18	4	12	56	53	+3	58	
5	Caraimanul Bușteni	34	17	4	13	49	48	+1	55	
6	Feroemail Ploiești	34	14	7	13	37	36	+1	49	
7	Viitorul Pleașa	34	14	6	14	45	42	+3	48	
8	Electromontaj Câmpina	34	14	6	14	42	48	−6	48	
9	Precizia Breaza	34	11	13	10	44	40	+4	46	
10	Carotajul Ploiești	34	14	2	18	49	57	−8	44	
11	IUC Ploiești	34	13	3	18	48	54	−6	42	
12	Chimistul Valea Călugărească	34	11	9	14	45	55	−10	42	
13	AEI Urlați	34	13	3	18	43	54	−11	42	
14	Avântul Măneciu	34	13	3	18	28	58	−30	42	
15	Vulturul Băicoi	34	12	7	15	41	49	−8	41 (Note: Vulturul Băicoi deducted 2 points.)	
16	Petrolistul Boldești	34	11	7	16	38	33	+5	40	
17	Metalul CSU Vălenii de Munte (R)	34	11	5	18	49	52	−3	38	Relegation to Prahova County Championship II
18	Petrolul Unirea Teleajen Ploiești (R)	34	10	6	18	28	45	−17	36	Relegation to Prahova County Championship II

Rules for classification: 1) Points; 2) Goal difference; 3) Number of goals scored.
(C) Champions; (Q) Qualified for the phase indicated; (R) Relegated

=== Sălaj County ===
Pos	Team	Pld	W	D	L	GF	GA	GD	Pts	Qualification or relegation
1	Silvania Cehu Silvaniei (C, Q)	26	21	3	2	99	19	+80	45	Qualification to promotion play-off
2	Rapid Jibou	26	21	2	3	107	26	+81	44	
3	Minerul Ip	26	16	5	5	71	38	+33	37	
4	Minerul Surduc	26	16	1	9	99	49	+50	33	
5	Mobila Șimleu Silvaniei	26	13	2	11	54	41	+13	28	
6	Cetatea Valcău de Jos	26	13	1	12	61	62	−1	27	
7	Progresul Bălan	26	10	3	13	51	63	−12	23	
8	SEIAMC Benesat	26	10	3	13	50	65	−15	23	
9	Recolta Crișeni	26	9	4	13	45	56	−11	22	
10	Voința Aghireș	26	10	2	14	49	76	−27	22	
11	Olimpic Bocșa	26	9	3	14	47	65	−18	21	
12	Calmin Băbeni	26	6	3	17	33	70	−37	15	
13	Mecanizatorul Cozla	26	6	2	18	38	115	−77	14	
14	Unirea Hida	26	5	0	21	35	94	−59	10	

Rules for classification: 1) Points; 2) Goal difference; 3) Number of goals scored.
(C) Champions; (Q) Qualified for the phase indicated

=== Sibiu County ===
Pos	Team	Pld	W	D	L	GF	GA	GD	Pts	Qualification or relegation
1	Metalul-Voința Sibiu (C, Q)	30	22	2	6	76	25	+51	46	Qualification to promotion play-off
2	Record Mediaș	30	20	3	7	57	35	+22	43	
3	Unirea Ocna Sibiului	30	13	11	6	42	28	+14	37	
4	Carbomet Copșa Mică	30	13	10	7	45	28	+17	36	
5	Relee Mediaș	30	14	8	8	37	29	+8	36	
6	Construcții Sibiu	30	13	7	10	46	39	+7	33	
7	Firul Roșu Tălmaciu	30	15	2	13	50	42	+8	32	
8	ITA-Geamuri Mediaș	30	10	10	10	38	36	+2	30	
9	Mecanica Mediaș	30	12	6	12	44	45	−1	30	
10	Vitrometan Mediaș	30	11	7	12	55	45	+10	29	
11	CFR-IUPS Sibiu	30	12	3	15	48	57	−9	27	
12	Tractorul Sibiu	30	9	6	15	30	37	−7	24	
13	Progresul Orlat	30	10	3	17	37	63	−26	23	
14	Vulturii Șura Mică	30	7	7	16	21	61	−40	21	
15	Textila Mediaș	30	7	6	17	36	63	−27	20	
16	Sparta Mediaș	30	4	5	21	26	55	−29	13	

Rules for classification: 1) Points; 2) Goal difference; 3) Number of goals scored.
(C) Champions; (Q) Qualified for the phase indicated

=== Suceava County ===
Pos	Team	Pld	W	D	L	GF	GA	GD	Pts	Qualification or relegation
1	Minerul Crucea (C, Q)	30	24	3	3	117	27	+90	51	Qualification to promotion play-off
2	Unirea Emil Bodnăraș	30	21	4	5	96	27	+69	46	
3	Metalul IMU Suceava	30	20	3	7	73	28	+45	43	
4	Șoimii Preutești	30	16	1	13	64	57	+7	33	
5	Foresta Moldovița	30	15	2	13	66	47	+19	32	
6	Minerul Iacobeni	30	14	2	14	49	50	−1	30	
7	Viitorul Arbore	30	13	4	13	62	69	−7	30	
8	Metalul Putna	30	14	4	12	53	61	−8	30 (Note: Metalul Putna and Bradul Vama deducted 2 points.)	
9	Minerul Stulpicani	30	12	4	14	70	51	+19	27 (Note: Minerul Stulpicani, Recolta Fântânele, Victoria Solca, Dumbrava Dumbrăveni and Bucovina Calafindești deducted 1 point.)	
10	Recolta Fântânele	30	12	4	14	57	100	−43	27	
11	Victoria Solca	30	11	4	15	56	70	−14	25	
12	Bradul Vama	30	13	1	16	65	83	−18	25	
13	Dumbrava Dumbrăveni	30	12	1	17	57	76	−19	24	
14	Fuiorul Cornu Luncii	30	11	2	17	60	85	−25	24	
15	Bucovina Calafindești	30	8	3	19	60	90	−30	18	
16	Rapid Suceava	30	4	1	25	35	119	−84	0 (Note: Rapid Suceava deducted 9 points.)	

Rules for classification: 1) Points; 2) Goal difference; 3) Number of goals scored.
(C) Champions; (Q) Qualified for the phase indicated

== See also ==
- 1988–89 Divizia A
- 1988–89 Divizia B
