= Muszka =

Muszka may refer to:

- Muszka, the Hungarian name for Mâsca village, Șiria Commune, Arad County, Romania
- Muszka-patak
- Adam Muszka
