= Curtuiușu =

Curtuiușu may refer to one of several places in Romania:

- Curtuiușu Dejului, a village in Vad Commune, Cluj County
- Curtuiușu Mare, a village in Valea Chioarului Commune, Maramureș County
- Curtuiușu Mic, a village in Copalnic-Mănăștur Commune, Maramureș County
- Curtuiușu River
