= Berchezoaia =

- Location within Romania

Location
- Country: Romania
- Counties: Maramureș County
- Villages: Berchezoaia, Berchez

Physical characteristics
- Mouth: Bârsău
  - location: near Șomcuta Mare
  - coordinates: 47.5286°N 23.4670°E
- Length: 10 km (6.2 mi)
- Basin size: 14 km^{2} (5.4 sq mi)

Basin features
- Progression: Bârsău→ Someș→ Tisza→ Danube→ Black Sea

The Berchezoaia is a right tributary of the river Bârsău in Romania. It flows into the Bârsău between Șomcuta Mare and Finteușu Mare. Its length is 10 km (6.2 mi) and its basin size is 14 km^{2} (5.4 sq mi).
