= Valea Chioarului mine =

Bentonite mine in Maramureș, Romania

- Location: Valea Chioarului, Maramureș County, Romania
- Products: Bentonite

The Valea Chioarului mine is a large mine in the northwest of Romania in Maramureș County, 30 km south of Baia Mare and 520 km northwest of the capital, Bucharest. Valea Chioarului represents one of the largest bentonite reserve in Romania having estimated reserves of 20 million tonnes.
