= Stadionul Progresul (Șomcuta Mare) =

Stadium in Romania

- Interactive map of Stadionul Progresul
- Address: Str. Republicii, nr. 46
- Location: Șomcuta Mare, Romania
- Coordinates: 47°29′35.8″N 23°28′34.0″E
- Owner: Town of Șomcuta Mare
- Operator: Progresul Șomcuta Mare
- Capacity: 400 seated
- Surface: Grass

Construction
- Opened: 1970
- Renovated: 2016–2018

Tenant
- Progresul Șomcuta Mare (1970–present)

Stadionul Progresul is a multi-purpose stadium in Șomcuta Mare, Romania. It is currently used mostly for football matches, has a capacity of 400 seats and is the home ground of Progresul Șomcuta Mare.
