= Dac-am plecat, Ardealule, din tine =

Romanian patriotic song

"Dac-am plecat, Ardealule, din tine" (transl. "If we have left, Transylvania, from you") is a Romanian patriotic song. It is also simply known as "Ardealul" (transl. "Transylvania"). It appeared after the cession of Northern Transylvania to Hungary in 1940. At the time, Romania was also forced to give up Bessarabia, Northern Bukovina and the Hertsa region to the Soviet Union, as well as Southern Dobruja to Bulgaria. The Second Vienna Award of 30 August, which caused the loss of Northern Transylvania, caused great consternation among the Romanian public. Its author is unknown, although it is thought to have been a contemporary soldier.

It is recorded that demobilized soldiers from Northern Transylvania went to Șiria and sang the first stanza of the song. Here, it quickly became popular among the inhabitants. It was also sung in 1944 during the Budapest Offensive when Romanian troops attacked Hungary to recover the region.

Nowadays, it can be found in the repertoire of the Romanian Army Choir or the male choir of the village of Finteușu Mare. From the latter, the folk singer Veta Biriș took the song and added it to her repertoire, with different lyrics written by a collaborator of her. These refer to the emigration of Romanians abroad since the Romanian Revolution of 1989. Another folk singer who has made his own version is Felix Gălan. Furthermore, it is a song used by Legionnaires in the country.

== Lyrics ==
The lyrics of the original version (and their English translation) are the following:

Dac-am plecat, Ardealule, din tine
Nu-i vina noastră, iarăși vom veni.
N-am fost învinși și nu vom fi nici mâine,
Când ceasul biruinței va sosi.

Cor:
Aveam o țară scumpă și mândră,
Aveam și iarăși vom avea.
Dușmanul, care astăzi râde,
Va tremura privind la ea.

Noi te iubim, că tu ai fost al nostru,
Și viața pentru tine ne-am fi dat,
Dar prin dictatul rușinos și monstru
Hortiștii-au reușit de te-au furat.

Cor

De-aici, din depărtări, privim spre tine
Și plângem jalnic chinul tău amar,
Când știm că frații cei rămași în tine
Sunt torturați de un popor barbar.

Cor

Te vom lua, că tu ești doar al nostru,
Lăsat pe veci de daci și de romani,
Te-am moștenit de la strămoșii noștri
Și nimănui nu te-om lăsa în dar.

Cor

Vom trece iar pe vechea frontieră
Dreptatea noastră e stăpână-acum,
Prin vijelii și foc de mitralieră
Armata noastră își va face drum.

Cor

Credința în țară și mereu înainte,
Să cucerim ce-avem de cucerit,
Ardealul nostru e o țară scumpă,
Sălaj, Bihor și Clujule iubit!

Cor

Translation:

If we have left, Transylvania, from you
It is not our fault, we will come again.
We were not defeated and we will not be tomorrow,
When the hour of victory will arrive.

Chorus:
We had a dear and proud country,
We had and we will have again.
The enemy, who laughs today,
Will tremble looking at her.

We love you, as you have been ours,
And life we would have given for you,
But through the shameful and monstrous Diktat
Horthists have managed to steal you.

Chorus

From here, in the distance, we look at you
And we mourn your bitter pain,
When we know that brothers left inside you
Are being tortured by a barbaric people.

Chorus

We will take you, as you are only ours,
Left forever by the Dacians and the Romans,
We inherited you from our ancestors
And nobody will leave you as a gift.

Chorus

We will cross the old border again
Our right is in control now,
Through storms and machine gun fire
Our army will make its way.

Chorus

Faith in the country and always forward,
Let's conquer what we have to conquer,
Our Transylvania is a beloved land,
Dear Sălaj, Bihor and Cluj!

Chorus
