= 1988–89 Divizia B =

Divizia B
- Season: 1988–89
- Promoted: Petrolul Ploiești; Jiul Petroșani; Politehnica Timișoara
- Relegated: Metalul Plopeni; Electroputere Craiova; Minerul Cavnic; FEPA 74 Bârlad; Dacia Pitești; Minerul Paroșeni; Câmpulung Moldovenesc; Dunărea Călărași; Mecanica Orăștie; Delta Tulcea; Metalul Mangalia; Avântul Reghin
- Top goalscorer: Victor Titirișcă (Series I, 22 goals); Ion Carastoian (Series II, 18 goals); Nicolae Trăistaru (Series III, 22 goals)

The 1988–89 Divizia B was the 49th season of the second tier of the Romanian football league system.

The format has been maintained to three series, each of them having 18 teams. At the end of the season the winners of the series promoted to Divizia A and the last four places from each series relegated to Divizia C.

== Team changes ==
=== To Divizia B ===
Promoted from Divizia C

- Explorări Câmpulung Moldovenesc
- Aripile Victoria Bacău
- Metalul Mangalia
- Dunărea Călărași
- Metalul Mija
- Dacia Pitești
- Minerul Motru
- CFR Timișoara
- Minerul Cavnic
- Unirea Alba Iulia
- Avântul Reghin
- Poiana Câmpina

Relegated from Divizia A

- Politehnica Timișoara
- Petrolul Ploiești
- CSM Suceava

=== From Divizia B ===
Relegated to Divizia C

- Inter Vaslui
- Autobuzul București
- Sticla Arieșul Turda
- Unirea Slobozia
- Mecanică Fină București
- CIL Sighetu Marmației
- Olimpia Râmnicu Sărat
- Metalul București
- Minerul Baia Sprie
- Petrolul Ianca
- Progresul Vulcan București
- Victoria Carei

Promoted to Divizia A

- FC Constanța
- Inter Sibiu
- Bihor Oradea

=== Renamed teams ===
Aripile Victoria Bacău was renamed as Aripile Bacău.

Delta Dinamo Tulcea was renamed as Delta Tulcea.

Gloria Pandurii was renamed as Pandurii Târgu Jiu.

Prahova CSU Ploiești was renamed as Prahova Ploiești.

Sportul Muncitoresc Caracal was renamed as FCM Caracal.

Sportul Muncitoresc Slatina was renamed as Metalurgistul Slatina.

== League tables ==
=== Serie I ===
| Pos | Team | Pld | W | D | L | GF | GA | GD | Pts | Promotion or relegation |
|---|---|---|---|---|---|---|---|---|---|---|
| 1 | Petrolul Ploiești (C, P) | 34 | 20 | 7 | 7 | 62 | 26 | +36 | 47 | Promotion to Divizia A |
| 2 | Progresul Brăila | 34 | 19 | 1 | 14 | 56 | 41 | +15 | 39 | |
| 3 | Unirea Dinamo Focșani | 34 | 18 | 3 | 13 | 39 | 32 | +7 | 39 | |
| 4 | Gloria Buzău | 34 | 18 | 2 | 14 | 55 | 36 | +19 | 38 | |
| 5 | CFR Pașcani | 34 | 16 | 6 | 12 | 48 | 31 | +17 | 38 | |
| 6 | CSM Suceava | 34 | 16 | 6 | 12 | 46 | 39 | +7 | 38 | |
| 7 | Steaua Mizil | 34 | 17 | 2 | 15 | 52 | 50 | +2 | 36 | |
| 8 | Politehnica Iași | 34 | 16 | 3 | 15 | 63 | 43 | +20 | 35 | |
| 9 | CS Botoșani | 34 | 15 | 4 | 15 | 44 | 51 | −7 | 34 | |
| 10 | Poiana Câmpina | 34 | 15 | 4 | 15 | 38 | 48 | −10 | 34 | |
| 11 | Ceahlăul Piatra Neamț | 34 | 15 | 3 | 16 | 42 | 41 | +1 | 33 | |
| 12 | Siretul Pașcani | 34 | 15 | 3 | 16 | 40 | 40 | 0 | 33 | |
| 13 | Aripile Bacău | 34 | 14 | 5 | 15 | 41 | 51 | −10 | 33 | |
| 14 | Prahova Ploiești | 34 | 15 | 2 | 17 | 40 | 41 | −1 | 32 | |
| 15 | Metalul Plopeni (R) | 34 | 15 | 2 | 17 | 46 | 48 | −2 | 32 | Relegation to Divizia C |
| 16 | FEPA 74 Bârlad (R) | 34 | 12 | 3 | 19 | 33 | 57 | −24 | 27 | Relegation to Divizia C |
| 17 | Explorări Câmpulung Moldovenesc (R) | 34 | 9 | 6 | 19 | 30 | 65 | −35 | 24 | Relegation to Divizia C |
| 18 | Delta Tulcea (R) | 34 | 6 | 8 | 20 | 35 | 70 | −35 | 20 | Relegation to Divizia C |

Source: romaniansoccer.ro (in Romanian)
Rules for classification: 1) Points; 2) Goal difference; 3) Goals scored; 4) Head-to-head points; 5) Head-to-head goal difference; 6) Head-to-head goals scored; 7) Head-to-head away goals scored.
(C) Champions; (P) Promoted; (R) Relegated

=== Top scorers ===
The Series I top scorers:

22 goals

- (Romania) Victor Titirișcă (Progresul Brăila)

16 goals

- (Romania) Adrian Kereszi (Politehnica Iași)

15 goals

- (Romania) Lucian Bîșcă (Aripile Bacău & Petrolul Ploiești)

14 goals

- (Romania) Ion Ștefănescu (Metalul Plopeni)
- (Romania) Gheorghe Iamandi (Delta Dinamo Tulcea)

13 goals

- (Romania) Gheorghe Butoiu (Steaua Mizil)

=== Serie II ===
| Pos | Team | Pld | W | D | L | GF | GA | GD | Pts | Promotion or relegation |
|---|---|---|---|---|---|---|---|---|---|---|
| 1 | Jiul Petroșani (C, P) | 34 | 20 | 7 | 7 | 64 | 23 | +41 | 47 | Promotion to Divizia A |
| 2 | Chimia Râmnicu Vâlcea | 34 | 18 | 5 | 11 | 57 | 32 | +25 | 41 | |
| 3 | Electromureș Târgu Mureș | 34 | 17 | 7 | 10 | 57 | 48 | +9 | 41 | |
| 4 | FCM Caracal | 34 | 18 | 3 | 13 | 51 | 41 | +10 | 39 | |
| 5 | Pandurii Târgu Jiu | 34 | 15 | 6 | 13 | 39 | 40 | −1 | 36 | |
| 6 | Sportul 30 Decembrie | 34 | 16 | 3 | 15 | 32 | 28 | +4 | 35 | |
| 7 | ICIM Brașov | 34 | 16 | 3 | 15 | 40 | 40 | 0 | 35 | |
| 8 | Tractorul Brașov | 34 | 14 | 6 | 14 | 42 | 44 | −2 | 34 | |
| 9 | CS Târgoviște | 34 | 14 | 5 | 15 | 36 | 39 | −3 | 33 | |
| 10 | Metalul Mija | 34 | 14 | 5 | 15 | 48 | 55 | −7 | 33 | |
| 11 | Gaz Metan Mediaș | 34 | 13 | 7 | 14 | 42 | 52 | −10 | 33 | |
| 12 | Metalurgistul Slatina | 34 | 13 | 6 | 15 | 51 | 52 | −1 | 32 | |
| 13 | Minerul Motru | 34 | 12 | 8 | 14 | 35 | 44 | −9 | 32 | |
| 14 | Drobeta-Turnu Severin | 34 | 12 | 7 | 15 | 50 | 49 | +1 | 31 | |
| 15 | Electroputere Craiova (R) | 34 | 13 | 5 | 16 | 37 | 44 | −7 | 31 | Relegation to Divizia C |
| 16 | Dacia Pitești (R) | 34 | 12 | 6 | 16 | 38 | 47 | −9 | 30 | Relegation to Divizia C |
| 17 | Dunărea Călărași (R) | 34 | 8 | 9 | 17 | 39 | 63 | −24 | 25 | Relegation to Divizia C |
| 18 | Metalul Mangalia (R) | 34 | 9 | 6 | 19 | 35 | 52 | −17 | 24 | Relegation to Divizia C |

Source: romaniansoccer.ro (in Romanian)
Rules for classification: 1) Points; 2) Goal difference; 3) Goals scored; 4) Head-to-head points; 5) Head-to-head goal difference; 6) Head-to-head goals scored; 7) Head-to-head away goals scored.
(C) Champions; (P) Promoted; (R) Relegated

=== Top scorers ===
The Series I top scorers:

18 goals

- (Romania) Ion Carastoian (Metalul Mangalia)

15 goals

- (Romania) Marius Predatu (Gaz Metan Mediaș)

13 goals

- (Romania) Marian Calafeteanu (Electroputere Craiova)

12 goals

- (Romania) Dorian Gugu (Pandurii Târgu Jiu)
- (Romania) Alexandru Rus (Metalul Mija)

=== Serie III ===
| Pos | Team | Pld | W | D | L | GF | GA | GD | Pts | Promotion or relegation |
|---|---|---|---|---|---|---|---|---|---|---|
| 1 | Politehnica Timișoara (C, P) | 34 | 24 | 7 | 3 | 91 | 37 | +54 | 55 | Promotion to Divizia A |
| 2 | UTA Arad | 34 | 23 | 1 | 10 | 86 | 39 | +47 | 47 | |
| 3 | Olimpia Satu Mare | 34 | 18 | 8 | 8 | 64 | 29 | +35 | 44 | |
| 4 | Gloria Bistrița | 34 | 19 | 6 | 9 | 64 | 31 | +33 | 44 | |
| 5 | Unirea Alba Iulia | 34 | 18 | 1 | 15 | 64 | 47 | +17 | 37 | |
| 6 | Maramureș Baia Mare | 34 | 16 | 4 | 14 | 62 | 51 | +11 | 36 | |
| 7 | Progresul Timișoara | 34 | 14 | 6 | 14 | 61 | 55 | +6 | 34 | |
| 8 | CFR Timișoara | 34 | 15 | 4 | 15 | 45 | 46 | −1 | 34 | |
| 9 | Metalul Bocșa | 34 | 13 | 6 | 15 | 44 | 61 | −17 | 32 | |
| 10 | Armătura Zalău | 34 | 15 | 2 | 17 | 39 | 62 | −23 | 32 | |
| 11 | Strungul Arad | 34 | 12 | 7 | 15 | 46 | 51 | −5 | 31 | |
| 12 | Gloria Reșița | 34 | 13 | 5 | 16 | 41 | 66 | −25 | 31 | |
| 13 | Chimica Târnăveni | 34 | 14 | 2 | 18 | 64 | 59 | +5 | 30 | |
| 14 | CSM Reșița | 34 | 14 | 2 | 18 | 45 | 47 | −2 | 30 | |
| 15 | Minerul Cavnic (R) | 34 | 14 | 2 | 18 | 50 | 56 | −6 | 30 | Relegation to Divizia C |
| 16 | Paroșeni Vulcan (R) | 34 | 12 | 3 | 19 | 37 | 61 | −24 | 27 | Relegation to Divizia C |
| 17 | Mecanica Orăștie (R) | 34 | 11 | 2 | 21 | 37 | 79 | −42 | 24 | Relegation to Divizia C |
| 18 | Avântul Reghin (R) | 34 | 4 | 6 | 24 | 22 | 85 | −63 | 14 | Relegation to Divizia C |

Source: romaniansoccer.ro (in Romanian)
Rules for classification: 1) Points; 2) Goal difference; 3) Goals scored; 4) Head-to-head points; 5) Head-to-head goal difference; 6) Head-to-head goals scored; 7) Head-to-head away goals scored.
(C) Champions; (P) Promoted; (R) Relegated

=== Top scorers ===
The Series I top scorers:

22 goals

- (Romania) Nicolae Trăistaru (Politehnica Timișoara)

18 goals

- (Romania) Iani Mitracu (Unirea Alba Iulia)
- (Romania) Gheorghe Mărginean (Chimica Târnăveni)

16 goals

- (Romania) Ștefan Nagy (UTA Arad)

14 goals

- (Romania) Mircea Bolba (Olimpia Satu Mare)
- (Romania) Neluțu Popa (Unirea Alba Iulia)

== See also ==
- 1988–89 Divizia A
