= 1987–88 Divizia C =

Third tier Romanian football league

Divizia C
- Season: 1987–88

The 1987–88 Divizia C was the 32nd season of Liga III, the third tier of the Romanian football league system.

The format has been maintained to twelve series, each of them having 16 teams. At the end of the season the winners of the series promoted to Divizia B and the last two places from each series relegated to County Championship.

== Team changes ==
=== To Divizia C ===
Relegated from Divizia B

- Aripile Victoria Bacău
- Minerul Gura Humorului
- Dunărea CSU Galați
- Poiana Câmpina
- ROVA Roșiori
- Carpați Mârșa
- Automatica București
- IMASA Sfântu Gheorghe
- Aurul Brad
- Mureșul Deva
- Steaua CFR Cluj-Napoca
- Minerul Cavnic

Promoted from County Championship

- Celuloza ITA Piatra Neamț
- Lacul Ursu Sovata
- Mecon Gheorghe Gheorghiu-Dej
- Moldosin Vaslui
- Conpref Constanța
- ASA Buzău
- Montana Sinaia
- IMGB București
- Petrolul Târgoviște
- Edilul IJGCL Pitești
- Automecanica Reșița
- Auto Vulcan Timișoara
- Textila Cisnădie
- Cuprom Baia Mare
- Motorul IMA Arad
- Hebe Sângeorz-Băi
- Carpați Covasna
- Celuloza Drobeta-Turnu Severin
- Izomat Șimleu Silvaniei
- Progresul Brăila
- Dacia Metalul Râmnicu Vâlcea
- Victoria Munteni-Buzău
- Aurora Târgu Frumos
- Utilaje Grele Giurgiu

=== From Divizia C ===
Promoted to Divizia B

- Siretul Pașcani
- Inter Vaslui
- Petrolul Ianca Brăila
- Sportul 30 Decembrie
- Metalul București
- Sportul Muncitoresc Caracal
- Gloria Reșița
- Progresul Timișoara
- Sticla Arieșul Turda
- Minerul Baia Sprie
- Electromureș Târgu Mureș
- Metalul Plopeni

Relegated to County Championship

- CSM Bucecea
- Cristalul Dorohoi
- Metalul IM Roman
- Letea Bacău
- Energia Mărășești
- Granitul Babadag
- Victoria Lehliu
- Voința Constanța
- Voința București
- ICSIM București
- Lotru Brezoi
- Constructorul Pitești
- Armătura Strehaia
- Victoria Înainte Vânju Mare
- Minerul Ghelari
- Victoria Călan
- Bihoreana Marghita
- Minerul Dr.Petru Groza
- Silvania Cehu Silvanlei
- Bradul Vișeu de Sus
- Carpați Agnita
- Unirea Ocna Sibiului
- Torpedo Zărnești
- IPT Întorsura Buzăului

=== Renamed teams ===
Minerul Vatra Dornei was renamed as Steaua Minerul Vatra Dornei.

Celuloza Drobeta-Turnu Severin was renamed as Termoconstructorul Turnu Severin.

Oțelul Călărași was renamed as Dunărea Călărași.

CFR IACP București was renamed as CFR BTA București.

Edilul IJGCL Pitești was renamed as Unirea Pitești.

Minerul Mecanizatorul Șimian was renamed as Mecanizatorul Șimian.

Minerul Jilț Mătăsari was renamed as Minerul Mătăsari.

Auto Timișoara was renamed as Auto Vulcan Timișoara.

Obilici Sânmartinu Sârbesc was renamed as AS Sânmartinu Sârbesc.

Chimia Zalău was renamed as Laminorul Victoria Zalău.

=== Other changes ===
Șantierul Naval Tulcea entered into partnership with CSȘ Tulcea and was renamed as Șantierul Naval CSȘ Tulcea.

Victoria FIUT Carei took the place of Unio Satu Mare in Divizia B due to the merge between Unio Satu Mare and Olimpia Satu Mare.

Minerul Turț took the place of Victoria FIUT Carei in Divizia C.

== League tables ==
=== Seria I ===
Pos	Team	Pld	W	D	L	GF	GA	GD	Pts	Qualification or relegation
1	ASA Explorări Câmpulung Moldovenesc (C, P)	30	22	1	7	68	23	+45	67	Promotion to Divizia B
2	Steaua Minerul Vatra Dornei	30	16	3	11	38	38	0	51	
3	Metalul Rădăuți	30	14	4	12	36	37	−1	46	
4	Chimia Fălticeni	30	14	3	13	72	37	+35	45	
5	Cetatea Târgu Neamț	30	14	3	13	42	34	+8	45	
6	Aurora Târgu Frumos	30	14	3	13	47	43	+4	45	
7	Constructorul Iași	30	13	5	12	43	48	−5	44	
8	Avântul TCMM Frasin	30	14	2	14	41	48	−7	44	
9	Zimbrul Siret	30	14	0	16	44	77	−33	42	
10	Carpați Gălănești	30	12	5	13	40	44	−4	41	
11	Relonul Săvinești	30	12	4	14	49	47	+2	40	
12	Minerul Gura Humorului	30	13	2	15	41	43	−2	40 (Note: Minerul Gura Humorului deducted 1 points.)	
13	Metalul Botoșani	30	13	1	16	40	47	−7	40	
14	Celuloza ITA Piatra Neamț	30	12	3	15	51	51	0	39	
15	Tepro Iași (R)	30	13	0	17	38	44	−6	39	Relegation to County Championship
16	Electro Botoșani (R)	30	9	3	18	29	58	−29	30	Relegation to County Championship

Source: romaniansoccer.ro
Rules for classification: 1) Points; 2) Goal difference; 3) Number of goals scored.
(C) Champions; (P) Promoted; (R) Relegated

=== Seria II ===
Pos	Team	Pld	W	D	L	GF	GA	GD	Pts	Qualification or relegation
1	Aripile Victoria Bacău (C, P)	30	21	6	3	77	24	+53	69	Promotion to Divizia B
2	Mecanica Vaslui	30	18	6	6	59	33	+26	60	
3	Steaua Mecanica Huși	30	18	2	10	55	35	+20	56	
4	Mecon Gheorghe Gheorghiu-Dej	30	16	3	11	55	29	+26	51	
5	Petrolul Moinești	30	16	2	12	53	39	+14	50	
6	CSM Borzești	30	16	2	12	45	33	+12	50	
7	Partizanul Bacău	30	15	3	12	48	35	+13	48	
8	Foresta Gugești	30	15	2	13	39	47	−8	47	
9	Unirea Negrești	30	14	0	16	38	54	−16	42	
10	Minerul Comănești	30	13	2	15	40	43	−3	41	
11	Textila Buhuși	30	13	2	15	43	49	−6	41	
12	Proletarul Bacău	30	13	1	16	41	51	−10	40	
13	Laminorul Roman	30	12	3	15	45	40	+5	39	
14	Luceafărul Adjud	30	11	2	17	28	46	−18	35	
15	Constructorul Hidro Focșani (R)	30	7	2	21	27	63	−36	23	Relegation to County Championship
16	Moldosin Vaslui (R)	30	3	0	27	18	90	−72	9	Relegation to County Championship

Source: romaniansoccer.ro
Rules for classification: 1) Points; 2) Goal difference; 3) Number of goals scored.
(C) Champions; (P) Promoted; (R) Relegated

=== Seria III ===
Pos	Team	Pld	W	D	L	GF	GA	GD	Pts	Qualification or relegation
1	Metalul Mangalia (C, P)	30	21	3	6	58	21	+37	66	Promotion to Divizia B
2	Gloria Galați	30	18	2	10	48	31	+17	56	
3	Dunărea CSU Galați	30	17	3	10	78	28	+50	52 (Note: Dunărea CSU Galați deducted 2 points.)	
4	IMU CSȘ Medgidia	30	15	5	10	47	24	+23	50	
5	Portul Constanța	30	15	3	12	44	33	+11	48	
6	Arrubium Măcin	30	15	2	13	40	45	−5	47	
7	Conpref Constanța	30	15	2	13	55	40	+15	47	
8	Progresul Isaccea	30	15	1	14	52	54	−2	46	
9	Cimentul Medgidia	30	14	2	14	55	52	+3	44	
10	Progresul Brăila	30	13	4	13	44	48	−4	43	
11	Șantierul Naval CSȘ Tulcea	30	14	1	15	35	49	−14	43	
12	Victoria IRA Tecuci	30	13	3	14	48	39	+9	42	
13	DVA Portul Galați	30	13	2	15	51	44	+7	41	
14	Laminorul Viziru	30	13	2	15	42	58	−16	41	
15	Chimia Brăila (R)	30	9	2	19	28	57	−29	29	Relegation to County Championship
16	Minerul Mahmudia (R)	30	1	1	28	13	115	−102	4	Relegation to County Championship

Source: romaniansoccer.ro
Rules for classification: 1) Points; 2) Goal difference; 3) Number of goals scored.
(C) Champions; (P) Promoted; (R) Relegated

=== Seria IV ===
Pos	Team	Pld	W	D	L	GF	GA	GD	Pts	Qualification or relegation
1	Dunărea Călărași (C, P)	30	22	2	6	94	25	+69	68	Promotion to Divizia B
2	Unirea Urziceni	30	17	3	10	59	39	+20	54	
3	ASA Buzău	30	15	3	12	61	36	+25	48	
4	Utilaje Grele Giurgiu	30	14	5	11	48	53	−5	47	
5	Șantierul Naval Oltenița	30	14	3	13	54	38	+16	45	
6	ISCIP Ulmeni	30	13	4	13	40	44	−4	43	
7	Chimia Buzău	30	14	1	15	37	42	−5	43	
8	Dunăreana Giurgiu	30	12	6	12	37	39	−2	42	
9	Victoria Țăndărei	30	13	3	14	52	64	−12	42	
10	Petrolul Roata de Jos	30	13	1	16	57	53	+4	40	
11	Olimpia Slobozia	30	13	1	16	48	46	+2	40	
12	Victoria Munteni-Buzău	30	13	0	17	39	78	−39	39	
13	Viitorul Chirnogi	30	12	2	16	33	60	−27	38	
14	Petrolul Berca	30	11	4	15	38	39	−1	37	
15	Carpați Nehoiu (R)	30	11	3	16	31	66	−35	36	Relegation to County Championship
16	Metalul Buzău (R)	30	8	9	13	38	44	−6	33	Relegation to County Championship

Source: romaniansoccer.ro
Rules for classification: 1) Points; 2) Goal difference; 3) Number of goals scored.
(C) Champions; (P) Promoted; (R) Relegated

=== Seria V ===
Pos	Team	Pld	W	D	L	GF	GA	GD	Pts	Qualification or relegation
1	Metalul Mija (C, P)	30	19	5	6	53	20	+33	62	Promotion to Divizia B
2	Automatica București	30	17	2	11	63	36	+27	53	
3	IUPS Chitila	30	14	4	12	48	43	+5	46	
4	Viscofil București	30	14	4	12	40	36	+4	46	
5	Avicola Crevedia	30	14	2	14	36	32	+4	44	
6	Mecon București	30	12	6	12	37	31	+6	42	
7	Minerul Șotânga	30	13	3	14	41	42	−1	42	
8	Electrica Titu	30	14	0	16	53	54	−1	42	
9	CFR BTA București	30	13	3	14	38	40	−2	42	
10	Abatorul București	30	13	3	14	36	52	−16	42	
11	Danubiana București	30	12	4	14	49	52	−3	40	
12	Cimentul Fieni	30	12	4	14	42	55	−13	40	
13	Tehnometal București	30	12	3	15	40	46	−6	39	
14	IMGB București	30	12	3	15	35	49	−14	39	
15	Chimia Găești (R)	30	11	5	14	37	34	+3	38	Relegation to County Championship
16	Petrolul Târgoviște (R)	30	10	5	15	32	58	−26	35	Relegation to County Championship

Source: romaniansoccer.ro
Rules for classification: 1) Points; 2) Goal difference; 3) Number of goals scored.
(C) Champions; (P) Promoted; (R) Relegated

=== Seria VI ===
Pos	Team	Pld	W	D	L	GF	GA	GD	Pts	Qualification or relegation
1	Dacia Pitești (C, P)	30	19	4	7	58	29	+29	61	Promotion to Divizia B
2	Automatica Alexandria	30	17	3	10	54	26	+28	54	
3	Constructorul TCI Craiova	30	17	2	11	55	34	+21	53	
4	Muscelul Câmpulung	30	17	2	11	48	30	+18	53	
5	Chimia Turnu Măgurele	30	14	3	13	52	31	+21	45	
6	Progresul Corabia	30	12	6	12	35	45	−10	42	
7	Viitorul Drăgășani	30	13	3	14	41	52	−11	42	
8	IOB Balș	30	12	5	13	24	35	−11	41	
9	Progresul Băilești	30	12	3	15	30	44	−14	39	
10	Recolta Stoicănești	30	12	3	15	39	61	−22	39	
11	Unirea Pitești	30	10	8	12	47	43	+4	38	
12	Dacia Metalul Râmnicu Vâlcea	30	11	5	14	35	43	−8	38	
13	Electronistul Curtea de Argeș	30	12	2	16	33	46	−13	38	
14	ROVA Roșiori	30	11	4	15	42	40	+2	37	
15	Textila Roșiori (R)	30	10	5	15	29	41	−12	35	Relegation to County Championship
16	CFR Craiova (R)	30	11	2	17	25	47	−22	35	Relegation to County Championship

Source: romaniansoccer.ro
Rules for classification: 1) Points; 2) Goal difference; 3) Number of goals scored.
(C) Champions; (P) Promoted; (R) Relegated

=== Seria VII ===
Pos	Team	Pld	W	D	L	GF	GA	GD	Pts	Qualification or relegation
1	Minerul Motru (C, P)	30	19	3	8	70	32	+38	60	Promotion to Divizia B
2	CSM Caransebeș	30	17	2	11	58	34	+24	53	
3	Minerul Moldova Nouă	30	16	3	11	56	42	+14	51	
4	CSM Lugoj	30	15	2	13	52	31	+21	47	
5	Automecanica Reșița	30	14	3	13	31	34	−3	45	
6	Petrolul Țicleni	30	14	3	13	38	51	−13	45	
7	CFR Victoria Caransebeș	30	13	5	12	52	39	+13	44	
8	Minerul Oravița	30	14	2	14	52	53	−1	44	
9	Minerul Anina	30	14	1	15	47	45	+2	43	
10	Mecanizatorul Șimian	30	14	1	15	29	50	−21	43	
11	Minerul Mătăsari	30	13	2	15	41	46	−5	41	
12	Dierna Orșova	30	13	2	15	37	51	−14	41	
13	Termoconstructorul Turnu Severin	30	13	1	16	42	48	−6	40	
14	Metalurgistul Sadu	30	12	3	15	35	45	−10	39	
15	Energia Minerul Rovinari (R)	30	11	2	17	35	54	−19	35	Relegation to County Championship
16	Metalul Oțelu Roșu (R)	30	8	5	17	31	51	−20	29	Relegation to County Championship

Source: romaniansoccer.ro
Rules for classification: 1) Points; 2) Goal difference; 3) Number of goals scored.
(C) Champions; (P) Promoted; (R) Relegated

=== Seria VIII ===
Pos	Team	Pld	W	D	L	GF	GA	GD	Pts	Qualification or relegation
1	CFR Timișoara (C, P)	30	21	2	7	87	24	+63	65	Promotion to Divizia B
2	Vagonul Arad	30	18	2	10	55	31	+24	56	
3	Unirea Tomnatic	30	17	2	11	58	58	0	53	
4	Auto Vulcan Timișoara	30	16	1	13	58	47	+11	49	
5	Strungul Chișineu-Criș	30	16	0	14	59	53	+6	48	
6	Sânmartinu Sârbesc	30	15	1	14	62	49	+13	46	
7	Unirea Sânnicolau Mare	30	15	1	14	43	50	−7	46	
8	Minerul Șuncuiuș	30	14	2	14	38	57	−19	44	
9	Înfrățirea Oradea	30	13	3	14	49	36	+13	42	
10	Oțelul Dr.Petru Groza	30	13	3	14	43	50	−7	42	
11	Gloria Beiuș	30	13	2	15	38	53	−15	41	
12	Motorul IMA Arad	30	13	1	16	47	46	+1	40	
13	UM Timișoara	30	13	1	16	44	44	0	40	
14	Șoimii Lipova	30	13	0	17	49	61	−12	39	
15	Recolta Salonta (R)	30	10	5	15	37	47	−10	35	Relegation to County Championship
16	Unirea Valea lui Mihai (R)	30	6	2	22	21	82	−61	20	Relegation to County Championship

Source: romaniansoccer.ro
Rules for classification: 1) Points; 2) Goal difference; 3) Number of goals scored.
(C) Champions; (P) Promoted; (R) Relegated

=== Seria IX ===
Pos	Team	Pld	W	D	L	GF	GA	GD	Pts	Qualification or relegation
1	Minerul Cavnic (C, P)	30	23	1	6	80	31	+49	68 (Note: Minerul Cavnic deducted 2 points.)	Promotion to Divizia B
2	Steaua CFR Cluj-Napoca	30	20	3	7	73	29	+44	62 (Note: Steaua CFR Cluj deducted 1 points.)	
3	Industria Sârmei Câmpia Turzii	30	16	3	11	61	38	+23	51	
4	Laminorul Victoria Zalău	30	15	4	11	47	38	+9	49	
5	Someșul Satu Mare	30	14	2	14	58	50	+8	44	
6	Minerul Turț	30	14	2	14	39	47	−8	44	
7	Minerul Sărmășag	30	14	1	15	57	61	−4	43	
8	Izomat Șimleu Silvaniei	30	14	1	15	49	64	−15	43	
9	Olimpia Gherla	30	13	2	15	38	52	−14	41	
10	Minerul Băița	30	13	1	16	51	54	−3	40	
11	Minerul Baia Borșa	30	13	1	16	51	56	−5	40	
12	Oașul Negrești-Oaș	30	13	1	16	49	60	−11	40	
13	Chimia Tășnad	30	13	0	17	47	54	−7	39	
14	Cuprom Baia Mare	30	12	2	16	53	58	−5	38	
15	Minerul Băiuț (R)	30	12	2	16	32	49	−17	38	Relegation to County Championship
16	Motorul IRA Cluj-Napoca (R)	30	7	2	21	37	81	−44	23	Relegation to County Championship

Source: romaniansoccer.ro
Rules for classification: 1) Points; 2) Goal difference; 3) Number of goals scored.
(C) Champions; (P) Promoted; (R) Relegated

=== Seria X ===
Pos	Team	Pld	W	D	L	GF	GA	GD	Pts	Qualification or relegation
1	Unirea Alba Iulia (C, P)	30	24	2	4	83	31	+52	74	Promotion to Divizia B
2	Mureșul Deva	30	21	4	5	64	23	+41	67	
3	Aurul Brad	30	17	1	12	62	32	+30	52	
4	Minerul Știința Vulcan	30	16	2	12	47	35	+12	50	
5	Metalurgistul Cugir	30	14	2	14	57	34	+23	44	
6	Nitramonia Făgăraș	30	12	5	13	44	57	−13	41	
7	CSU Mecanica Sibiu	30	13	1	16	34	50	−16	40	
8	Metalul Aiud	30	12	3	15	46	54	−8	39	
9	Șoimii IPA Sibiu	30	12	2	16	44	43	+1	38	
10	Minerul Lupeni	30	11	5	14	28	35	−7	38	
11	Textila Cisnădie	30	12	2	16	47	66	−19	38	
12	Carpați Mârșa	30	12	2	16	39	59	−20	38	
13	Automecanica Mediaș	30	10	7	13	32	47	−15	37	
14	CFR Simeria	30	11	3	16	51	60	−9	36	
15	Târnavele Blaj (R)	30	11	2	17	33	62	−29	35	Relegation to County Championship
16	Mecanica Alba Iulia (R)	30	8	5	17	39	62	−23	29	Relegation to County Championship

Source: romaniansoccer.ro
Rules for classification: 1) Points; 2) Goal difference; 3) Number of goals scored.
(C) Champions; (P) Promoted; (R) Relegated

=== Seria XI ===
Pos	Team	Pld	W	D	L	GF	GA	GD	Pts	Qualification or relegation
1	Avântul Reghin (C, P)	30	21	3	6	77	22	+55	66	Promotion to Divizia B
2	Progresul Odorheiu Secuiesc	30	18	7	5	63	18	+45	61	
3	Mecanica Bistrița	30	17	3	10	75	39	+36	54	
4	Lacul Ursu Sovata	30	14	2	14	49	39	+10	44	
5	Metalul Reghin	30	14	2	14	47	50	−3	44	
6	Unirea Cristuru Secuiesc	30	14	2	14	36	48	−12	44	
7	Oțelul Reghin	30	12	4	14	43	44	−1	40	
8	Minerul Bălan	30	12	4	14	38	46	−8	40	
9	Metalul Sighișoara	30	12	4	14	35	44	−9	40	
10	Metalotehnica Târgu Mureș	30	12	3	15	42	45	−3	39	
11	Chimforest Năsăud	30	11	5	14	46	49	−3	38	
12	Viitorul Gheorgheni	30	11	5	14	42	46	−4	38	
13	Mureșul Luduș	30	11	5	14	42	54	−12	38	
14	Laminorul Beclean	30	11	4	15	38	53	−15	37	
15	Minerul Rodna (R)	30	10	5	15	35	63	−28	35	Relegation to County Championship
16	Hebe Sângeorz-Băi (R)	30	10	2	18	33	81	−48	32	Relegation to County Championship

Source: romaniansoccer.ro
Rules for classification: 1) Points; 2) Goal difference; 3) Number of goals scored.
(C) Champions; (P) Promoted; (R) Relegated

=== Seria XII ===
Pos	Team	Pld	W	D	L	GF	GA	GD	Pts	Qualification or relegation
1	Poiana Câmpina (C, P)	30	20	5	5	53	18	+35	62 (Note: Poiana Câmpina deducted 3 points.)	Promotion to Divizia B
2	Electro Sfântu Gheorghe	30	18	4	8	62	24	+38	58	
3	IMASA Sfântu Gheorghe	30	17	5	8	63	33	+30	55 (Note: IMASA Sfântu Gheorghe deducted 1 points.)	
4	Montana Sinaia	30	15	5	10	47	32	+15	50	
5	Victoria Florești	30	15	3	12	52	43	+9	48	
6	Petrolul FSH Băicoi	30	14	1	15	37	43	−6	43	
7	Metalul Târgu Secuiesc	30	12	4	14	50	38	+12	40	
8	Minerul Baraolt	30	12	4	14	56	37	+19	40	
9	ASA Chimia Ploiești	30	12	4	14	38	42	−4	40	
10	Precizia Săcele	30	12	3	15	56	59	−3	39	
11	Minerul Filipeștii de Pădure	30	13	0	17	38	55	−17	39	
12	Unirea Câmpina	30	11	4	15	41	53	−12	37	
13	Cimentul Hoghiz	30	11	4	15	33	53	−20	37	
14	Carpați Covasna	30	11	3	16	33	56	−23	36	
15	Mobila Măgura Codlea (R)	30	11	1	18	32	65	−33	34	Relegation to County Championship
16	Carpați Sinaia (R)	30	10	2	18	35	75	−40	32	Relegation to County Championship

Source: romaniansoccer.ro
Rules for classification: 1) Points; 2) Goal difference; 3) Number of goals scored.
(C) Champions; (P) Promoted; (R) Relegated

== See also ==
- 1987–88 Divizia A
- 1987–88 Divizia B
- 1987–88 County Championship
- 1987–88 Cupa României
