= 1987–88 County Championship =

46th season of the Liga IV, the fourth tier of the Romanian football league

Liga IV
- Season: 1987–88

The 1987–88 County Championship was the 46th season of the Liga IV, the fourth tier of the Romanian football league system. The champions of each county association play against one from a neighboring county in a playoff to gain promotion.

== County championships ==
- Alba (AB)
- Arad (AR)
- Argeș (AG)
- Bacău (BC)
- Bihor (BH)
- Bistrița-Năsăud (BN)
- Botoșani (BT)
- Brașov (BV)
- Brăila (BR)
- Bucharest (B)
- Buzău (BZ)
- Caraș-Severin (CS)
- Călărași (CL)
- Cluj (CJ)
- Constanța (CT)
- Covasna (CV)
- Dâmbovița (DB)
- Dolj (DJ)
- Galați (GL)
- Giurgiu (GR)
- Gorj (GJ)
- Harghita (HR)
- Hunedoara (HD)
- Ialomița (IL)
- Iași (IS)
- Ilfov (IF)
- Maramureș (MM)
- Mehedinți (MH)
- Mureș (MS)
- Neamț (NT)
- Olt (OT)
- Prahova (PH)
- Satu Mare (SM)
- Sălaj (SJ)
- Sibiu (SB)
- Suceava (SV)
- Teleorman (TR)
- Timiș (TM)
- Tulcea (TL)
- Vaslui (VS)
- Vâlcea (VL)
- Vrancea (VN)

== Promotion play-off ==
Teams promoted to Divizia C without a play-off matches as teams from less represented counties in the third division.

- (AB) Energia Săsciori
- (TR) Petrolul Poeni
- (VL) Forestierul Băbeni
- (BT) Bucecea
- (IS) Fortus Iași
- (DJ) Constructorul Șoimii Craiova
- (VN) Autobuzul Laminorul Focșani

Preliminary round

Team 1	Agg.	Team 2	1st leg	2nd leg
IAB Pantelimon (IF)	0–1	(B) URBIS București	0–1	0–0

The matches was played on 3 and 10 July 1988.

Team 1	Agg.	Team 2	1st leg	2nd leg
Rapid Miercurea Ciuc (HR)	1–0	(SV) Rapid Stimas Suceava	1–0	0–0
Avântul Zăpodeni (VS)	2–7	(NT) Metalul IM Roman	1–2	1–5
Mecanica Sport Galați (GL)	2–1	(BC) Forestierul Agăș	2–1	0–0
Granitul Babadag (TL)	4–1	(BR) Automobilul Însurăței	1–0	3–1
Rapid Fetești (IL)	4–5	(BZ) Hidrotehnica Buzău	4–2	0–3
Victoria Lehliu (CL)	5–4	(CT) Marina Mangalia	5–2	0–2
Electrica Fieni (DB)	2–2 (Note: Electrica Fieni won on the away goals rule.)	(B) URBIS București	0–0	2–2
SM Drăgănești-Olt (OT)	6–2	(GR) Șantierul Naval Giurgiu	4–0	2–2
Armătura Strehaia (MH)	4–6	(GJ) Petrolul Stoina	3–1	1–5
Progresul Gătaia (TM)	1–5	(AR) Petrolul Zădăreni	1–2	0–3
Rapid Jibou (SJ)	1–6	(BH) Voința Oradea	1–5	0–1
Foresta Satu Mare (SM)	1–2	(CJ) CUG Cluj-Napoca	1–1	0–1
Someșul Reteag (BN)	0–6	(MM) Bradul Vișeu	0–3	0–3
Carpați Brașov (BV)	1–0	(MS) IRA Târgu Mureș	1–0	0–0
Mecanica Fină Costești (AG)	2–7	(SB) Carpați Agnita	2–1	0–6
Retezatul Hațeg (HD)	2–1	(CS) Foresta Caransebeș	2–0	0–1
Metalul IUM Filipeștii de Pădure (PH)	6–1	(CV) IPT Întorsura Buzăului	4–0	2–1

== Championships standings ==
=== Arad County ===
Pos	Team	Pld	W	D	L	GF	GA	GD	Pts	Qualification or relegation
1	Petrolul Zădăreni (C, Q)	38	27	5	6	107	39	+68	59	Qualification to promotion play-off
2	Progresul Pecica	38	24	6	8	86	55	+31	54	
3	Victoria Ineu	38	22	7	9	87	34	+53	51	
4	CFR Arad	38	21	7	10	85	39	+46	49	
5	Victoria Felnac	38	18	6	14	74	63	+11	42	
6	Olimpia ISD Arad	38	18	6	14	66	63	+3	42	
7	Gloria Arad	38	14	12	12	59	56	+3	40	
8	Metalul Ineu	38	15	9	14	77	53	+24	39	
9	Explormin Hălmagiu	38	19	3	16	75	54	+21	39 (Note: Explormin Hălmagiu, Frontiera Curtici, Victoria Ceasuri Arad, Șoimii Pâncota and Tricoul Roșu Arad were deducted 2 points.)	
10	Mureșul Zădăreni	38	14	10	14	69	53	+16	38	
11	Foresta Sânpetru German	38	14	10	14	64	74	−10	38	
12	Crișana Sebiș	38	14	7	17	61	86	−25	35	
13	Frontiera Curtici	38	16	4	18	58	65	−7	34	
14	Unirea Șofronea	38	11	11	16	74	67	+7	33	
15	Olimpia Pădureni	38	13	7	18	40	49	−9	33	
16	Șiriana Șiria	38	14	5	19	65	102	−37	33	
17	Victoria Ceasuri Arad	38	12	6	20	43	60	−17	28	
18	Agronomia Șagu (R)	38	10	8	20	45	90	−45	28	Relegation to Arad County Championship II
19	Șoimii Pâncota (R)	38	10	5	23	42	92	−50	23	Relegation to Arad County Championship II
20	Tricoul Roșu Arad (R)	38	4	6	28	35	118	−83	12	Relegation to Arad County Championship II

Rules for classification: 1) Points; 2) Goal difference; 3) Number of goals scored.
(C) Champions; (Q) Qualified for the phase indicated; (R) Relegated

=== Bihor County ===
Pos	Team	Pld	W	D	L	GF	GA	GD	Pts	Qualification or relegation
1	Voința Oradea (C, Q)	32	25	6	1	94	15	+79	56	Qualification to promotion play-off
2	Minerul Ștei	32	26	3	3	78	18	+60	55	
3	Stăruința Săcuieni	32	22	4	6	87	19	+68	48	
4	Bihoreana Marghita	31	15	6	10	53	32	+21	36	
5	Recolta Diosig	32	15	4	13	57	43	+14	34	
6	Victoria Avram Iancu	32	15	1	16	56	56	0	31	
7	Minerul Voivozi	32	13	5	14	38	40	−2	31	
8	Metalica Oradea	32	10	9	13	45	46	−1	29	
9	Biharea Vașcău	32	13	3	16	45	67	−22	29	
10	Petrolul IMU Marghita	32	12	4	16	35	43	−8	28	
11	IAMT Oradea	32	11	5	16	46	52	−6	27	
12	Victoria Tulca	32	11	4	17	41	72	−31	26	
13	Stînca Vadu Crișului	31	11	3	17	58	64	−6	25	
14	Crișana Tinca	31	9	4	18	45	73	−28	22	
15	Avântul Mizieș	32	9	4	19	36	71	−35	22	
16	Termalul Livada	31	8	5	18	41	83	−42	21	
17	Sticla Pădurea Neagră	32	8	4	20	19	80	−61	20	
18	Voința Cheresig (Note: Voința Cheresig withdrew in the first part of the season and all its results were canceled.) (D)	0	0	0	0	0	0	0	0	Withdrew

Rules for classification: 1) Points; 2) Goal difference; 3) Number of goals scored.
(C) Champions; (D) Disqualified; (Q) Qualified for the phase indicated

=== Botoșani County ===
Pos	Team	Pld	W	D	L	GF	GA	GD	Pts	Qualification or relegation
1	Bucecea (C, Q)	26	24	0	2	108	21	+87	48	Qualification to promotion play-off
2	Dorohoi	26	20	2	4	90	21	+69	42	
3	Victoria Săveni	26	16	3	7	67	31	+36	35	
4	Unirea Tricolor Botoșani	26	14	5	7	58	41	+17	33	
5	Voința Șendriceni	26	13	4	9	49	49	0	30	
6	Sănătatea Darabani	26	14	1	11	43	39	+4	29	
7	Unirea Stăuceni	26	13	3	10	63	72	−9	29	
8	Spicul Iacobeni	26	10	2	14	43	69	−26	22	
9	Sportivul Trușești	26	9	2	15	45	62	−17	19 (Note: Sportivul Trușești, Avântul Mihai Eminescu, Avântul Albești and Recolta Sulița were deducted 1 point.)	
10	Avântul Mihai Eminescu	26	10	0	16	54	76	−22	19	
11	Avântul Albești	26	8	3	15	39	53	−14	18	
12	Recolta Sulița	26	8	3	15	47	68	−21	18	
13	Viitorul Dersca	26	5	0	21	17	67	−50	10	
14	INAB Botoșani	26	3	2	21	17	71	−54	8	

Rules for classification: 1) Points; 2) Goal difference; 3) Number of goals scored.
(C) Champions; (Q) Qualified for the phase indicated

=== Bucharest ===
The ranking combined points of the senior (3 points for a win) and junior (2 points for a win) teams.

Pos	Team	Pld	W	D	L	GF	GA	GD	Pts	Qualification or relegation
1	URBIS București (C, Q)	68	49	10	19	156	48	+108	129	Qualification to promotion play-off
2	Mecos București	68	40	9	19	119	64	+55	105	
3	ICME București	68	39	9	20	101	67	+34	104	
4	Calculatorul București	68	32	13	23	99	83	+16	96	
5	Flacăra ICEM București	68	33	8	27	95	72	+23	88	
6	Mașini Unelte București	68	28	18	22	79	66	+13	86	
7	Voința București	68	27	17	24	78	73	+5	86	
8	Aversa București	68	29	9	30	96	88	+8	83	
9	Laromet București	68	26	19	23	91	78	+13	82	
10	Gloria București	68	26	13	29	75	96	−21	79	
11	Electroaparataj București	68	27	11	30	80	86	−6	77	
12	Șoimii IMUC București	68	27	9	32	97	100	−3	75	
13	Electra București	68	26	7	35	83	102	−19	72	
14	Granitul București	68	21	17	30	74	91	−17	71	
15	Automecanica București	68	25	9	34	86	94	−8	68	
16	Vulcan București	68	24	7	37	80	114	−34	67	
17	Prefabricate București	68	18	12	38	70	128	−58	59	
18	ICSIM București	68	11	11	46	63	171	−108	37	

Rules for classification: 1) Points; 2) Goal difference; 3) Number of goals scored.
(C) Champion; (Q) Qualified for the phase indicated

=== Caraș-Severin County ===
Pos	Team	Pld	W	D	L	GF	GA	GD	Pts	Qualification or relegation
1	Foresta Caransebeș (C, Q)	38	31	2	5	117	30	+87	95	Qualification to promotion play-off
2	Energia ACH Caransebeș	38	31	1	6	124	36	+88	94	
3	Metalul Topleț	38	30	2	6	123	33	+90	92	
4	Hercules ACH Băile Herculane	38	22	3	13	85	61	+24	69	
5	Nera Bozovici	38	22	3	13	76	60	+16	69	
6	Autoforesta Bocșa	38	21	5	12	86	56	+30	68	
7	Muncitorul Știința Reșița	38	20	6	12	100	42	+58	66	
8	Foresta Zăvoi	38	20	3	15	77	47	+30	63	
9	Minerul Onca de Fier	38	18	5	15	59	56	+3	59	
10	Siderurgistul Reșița	38	16	5	17	71	59	+12	53	
11	Metalul Reșița	38	15	7	16	70	78	−8	52	
12	Minerul Constructorul Anina	38	15	3	20	63	68	−5	48	
13	Unirea Grădinari	38	14	5	19	66	89	−23	47	
14	Minerul Dognecea	38	15	2	21	64	93	−29	47	
15	Bistra Glimboca	38	13	4	21	49	80	−31	43	
16	Voința Berzasca	38	10	3	25	47	98	−51	33	
17	Voința Reșița	38	9	0	29	46	120	−74	27	
18	Viitorul Domașnea	38	7	3	28	46	138	−92	24	
19	Minerul Rușchița (D)	0	0	0	0	0	0	0	0	Withdrew
20	Minerul Mehadia (D)	0	0	0	0	0	0	0	0	Withdrew

Rules for classification: 1) Points; 2) Goal difference; 3) Number of goals scored.
(C) Champions; (D) Disqualified; (Q) Qualified for the phase indicated

=== Covasna County ===
Pos	Team	Pld	W	D	L	GF	GA	GD	Pts	Qualification or relegation
1	IPT Întorsura Buzăului (C, Q)	30	25	4	1	157	40	+117	84	Qualification to promotion play-off
2	IMP Sfântu Gheorghe	30	23	3	4	114	20	+94	79	
3	Diatomita Filia	30	20	3	7	77	45	+32	73	
4	Constructorul Sfântu Gheorghe	30	14	9	7	66	43	+23	67	
5	Avântul Catalina	30	17	3	10	64	49	+15	67	
6	Stăruința Bodoc	30	14	4	12	72	52	+20	62	
7	Victoria Ozun	30	12	7	11	53	60	−7	61	
8	Perkő Sânzieni	30	13	3	14	61	47	+14	59	
9	Unirea Reci	30	12	5	13	55	66	−11	59	
10	Stăruința Zagon	30	11	6	13	53	57	−4	58	
11	Harghita Aita Mare	30	9	6	15	43	66	−23	54	
12	Recolta Tamașfalău	30	9	6	15	41	61	−20	54	
13	Spartacus Hăghig	30	7	6	17	44	89	−45	49 (Note: Spartacus Hăghig deducted 1 points)	
14	Recolta Moacșa	30	9	0	21	42	106	−64	48	
15	Minerul Sfântu Gheorghe	30	8	3	19	54	93	−39	47 (Note: Minerul Sfântu Gheorghe and Progresul Brateș deducted 2 points.)	
16	Progresul Brateș (R)	30	3	1	26	21	134	−113	35	Relegation to Covasna County Championship II

Rules for classification: 1) Points; 2) Goal difference; 3) Number of goals scored.
(C) Champions; (Q) Qualified for the phase indicated; (R) Relegated

=== Harghita County ===
Pos	Team	Pld	W	D	L	GF	GA	GD	Pts	Qualification or relegation
1	Rapid Miercurea Ciuc (C, Q)	28	22	5	1	84	20	+64	49	Qualification to promotion play-off
2	Mureșul Toplița	28	19	4	5	90	22	+68	42	
3	Mureșul Suseni	28	14	5	9	71	30	+41	33	
4	Metalul Vlăhița	27	10	9	8	39	32	+7	29	
5	Avicola Cristuru Secuiesc	27	9	7	11	39	38	+1	25	
6	Tractorul Miercurea Ciuc	28	6	7	15	41	66	−25	19	
7	Mobila Ditrău	26	8	2	16	37	87	−50	18	
8	Complexul Gălăuțaș	28	2	1	25	26	132	−106	5	

Rules for classification: 1) Points; 2) Goal difference; 3) Number of goals scored.
(C) Champions; (Q) Qualified for the phase indicated

=== Maramureș County ===
Pos	Team	Pld	W	D	L	GF	GA	GD	Pts	Qualification or relegation
1	Bradul Vișeu (C, Q)	22	18	2	2	69	16	+53	38	Qualification to promotion play-off
2	Voința Târgu Lăpuș	22	18	1	3	74	19	+55	37	
3	IS Sighetu Marmației	22	17	1	4	51	30	+21	35	
4	Unirea Seini	22	16	1	5	85	23	+62	33	
5	Tractorul Satulung	22	10	1	11	32	37	−5	21	
6	Voința Ocna Șugatag	22	9	1	12	42	57	−15	19	
7	Progresul Șomcuta Mare	22	7	4	11	41	59	−18	18	
8	Metalul Bogdan Vodă	22	9	1	12	44	64	−20	17 (Note: Metalul Bogdan Vodă deducted 2 points.)	
9	Maramureșana Sighetu Marmației	22	6	3	13	39	46	−7	15	
10	Sticla Ulmeni	22	6	2	14	31	58	−27	14	
11	AEI Sighetu Marmației (R)	22	6	2	14	32	59	−27	14	Relegation to Liga V Maramureș
12	Stăruința Recea (R)	22	0	1	21	8	73	−65	1 (Note: Stăruința Recea withdrew in the second part of the season and all lost all remaining matches with 0–3.)	Relegation to Liga V Maramureș

Rules for classification: 1) Points; 2) Goal difference; 3) Number of goals scored.
(C) Champions; (Q) Qualified for the phase indicated; (R) Relegated

=== Mureș County ===
Pos	Team	Pld	W	D	L	GF	GA	GD	Pts	Qualification or relegation
1	IRA Târgu Mureș (C, Q)	30	21	7	2	71	27	+44	49	Qualification to promotion play-off
2	Transportul Târgu Mureș	30	16	9	5	50	26	+24	41	
3	Voința Sângeorgiu de Pădure	30	16	4	10	56	36	+20	36	
4	Avântul Târgu Mureș	30	13	8	9	61	31	+30	34	
5	Sticla Târnăveni	30	13	7	10	59	43	+16	33	
6	Energia Iernut	30	14	5	11	44	45	−1	33	
7	Voința Miercurea Nirajului	30	12	6	12	33	37	−4	30	
8	Voința Sărmașu	30	11	8	11	53	59	−6	30	
9	IMATEX Târgu Mureș	30	11	6	13	32	35	−3	28	
10	Valea Mureșului Gornești	29	11	6	12	37	43	−6	28	
11	Faianța Sighișoara	30	11	5	14	39	38	+1	27	
12	TCMRIC Târgu Mureș	30	10	7	13	41	41	0	27	
13	Viitorul Prodcomplex Târgu Mureș	30	11	5	14	30	38	−8	27	
14	Voința Târnăveni	30	9	7	14	39	47	−8	25	
15	Unirea Ungheni	30	5	5	20	36	65	−29	15	
16	Flamura Roșie Bogata	29	6	3	20	30	100	−70	13 (Note: Flamura Roșie Bogata deducted 2 points.)	

Rules for classification: 1) Points; 2) Goal difference; 3) Number of goals scored.
(C) Champions; (Q) Qualified for the phase indicated

=== Neamț County ===
Pos	Team	Pld	W	D	L	GF	GA	GD	Pts	Qualification or relegation
1	Metalul IM Roman (C, Q)	26	23	3	0	110	12	+98	49	Qualification to promotion play-off
2	Voința Roman	26	24	1	1	87	10	+77	49	
3	Cimentul Bicaz	26	13	7	6	48	25	+23	33	
4	Rapid Piatra Neamț	26	12	3	11	49	42	+7	27	
5	Voința Piatra Neamț	26	9	7	10	54	57	−3	25	
6	Danubiana Roman	26	10	4	12	47	55	−8	24	
7	Energia Săbăoani	26	10	2	14	54	54	0	22	
8	Șoimii Piatra Șoimului	26	10	2	14	47	63	−16	22	
9	Voința Târgu Neamț	26	7	7	12	40	54	−14	21	
10	Viitorul Podoleni	26	10	1	15	50	85	−35	21	
11	IM Piatra Neamț	26	6	8	12	35	43	−8	20	
12	AZO-TCM Săvinești	26	9	2	15	30	74	−44	20	
13	Spicul Tămășeni	26	7	3	16	27	57	−30	17	
14	Transformatorul Roman	26	5	4	17	28	75	−47	14	

Rules for classification: 1) Points; 2) Goal difference; 3) Number of goals scored.
(C) Champions; (Q) Qualified for the phase indicated

=== Olt County ===
Championship play-off

The play-off was contested by the winners of the four championship series.

Semi-finals

Team 1	Score	Team 2
Energia Cilieni	0–0 (5–4 p)	Balastiera Milcov
Viitorul Colonești	0–2	SM Drăgănești-Olt

Final

Team 1	Score	Team 2
SM Drăgănești-Olt	4–2	Energia Cilieni

SM Drăgănești-Olt won the Olt County Championship and qualify for promotion play-off in Divizia C.

=== Prahova County ===
Teams changes from previous season

Relegated from Divizia C

- —

Promoted to Divizia C

- Montana Sinaia

Promoted from Prahova County Championship II

- Rafinorul Ploiești
  (Ploiești Municipal Championship and play-off winners)
- Electromontaj Câmpina
  (Câmpina Territorial Championship and play-off winners)

Relegated to Prahova County Championship II

- Voința Vărbilău (18th place)

Other changes

- Unirea Teleajen Ploiești merged with Petrolul Teleajen Ploiești and was renamed Petrolul Unirea Teleajen Ploiești.

Pos	Team	Pld	W	D	L	GF	GA	GD	Pts	Qualification or relegation
1	Metalul IUM Filipeștii de Pădure (C, Q)	34	20	8	6	57	18	+39	68	Qualification to promotion play-off
2	Petrolistul Boldești	34	17	4	13	48	36	+12	55	
3	Chimistul Valea Călugărească	34	15	9	10	44	29	+15	54	
4	Precizia Breaza	34	16	6	12	38	28	+10	54	
5	Rafinorul Ploiești	34	17	3	14	55	52	+3	54	
6	Caraimanul Bușteni	34	16	6	12	42	39	+3	52 (Note: Caraimanul Bușteni, Geamul Scăieni and IUC Ploiești deducted 2 points.)	
7	Oțelul Câmpina	34	14	8	12	40	27	+13	50	
8	Electromontaj Câmpina	34	14	7	13	43	37	+6	49	
9	Geamul Scăeni	34	15	6	13	45	48	−3	49	
10	Carotajul Ploiești	34	14	5	15	52	52	0	47	
11	Viitorul Pleașa	34	15	5	14	42	43	−1	47 (Note: Viitorul Pleașa deducted 3 points.)	
12	Metalul CSU Vălenii de Munte	34	13	7	14	45	48	−3	46	
13	Petrolul Unirea Teleajen Ploiești	34	13	6	15	39	38	+1	45	
14	IUC Ploiești	34	15	2	17	40	50	−10	45	
15	Avântul Măneciu	34	12	7	15	42	49	−7	43	
16	Feroemail Ploiești	34	11	8	15	35	43	−8	41	
17	Progresul Ploiești (R)	34	11	6	17	32	46	−14	39	Relegation to Prahova County Championship II
18	Cristalul Azuga (R)	34	5	3	26	20	76	−56	18	Relegation to Prahova County Championship II

Rules for classification: 1) Points; 2) Goal difference; 3) Number of goals scored.
(C) Champions; (Q) Qualified for the phase indicated; (R) Relegated

=== Sălaj County ===
Pos	Team	Pld	W	D	L	GF	GA	GD	Pts	Qualification or relegation
1	Rapid Jibou (C, Q)	24	23	0	1	88	14	+74	46	Qualification to promotion play-off
2	Silvania Cehu Silvaniei	24	18	3	3	76	16	+60	39	
3	Cetatea Valcău de Jos	24	15	2	7	46	35	+11	32	
4	Mobila Șimleu Silvaniei	24	13	3	8	49	35	+14	29	
5	Minerul Ip	24	12	4	8	48	38	+10	28	
6	Progresul Bălan	24	12	0	12	40	43	−3	24	
7	Minerul Surduc	24	10	1	13	39	48	−9	21	
8	SEIAMC Benesat	24	9	2	13	37	48	−11	20	
9	Calmin Băbeni	24	9	2	13	32	65	−33	20	
10	Olimpic Bocșa	24	8	2	14	39	42	−3	18	
11	Unirea Hida	24	8	1	15	38	52	−14	17	
12	Voința Aghireș	24	6	0	18	29	71	−42	12	
13	PECO Zalău	24	3	0	21	11	66	−55	6	
14	Recolta Zăuan (Note: Recolta Zăuan withdrew in the first part of the season and all its results were canceled.) (D)	0	0	0	0	0	0	0	0	Withdrew

Rules for classification: 1) Points; 2) Goal difference; 3) Number of goals scored.
(C) Champions; (D) Disqualified; (Q) Qualified for the phase indicated

=== Sibiu County ===
Pos	Team	Pld	W	D	L	GF	GA	GD	Pts	Qualification or relegation
1	Carpați Agnita (C, Q)	30	22	4	4	78	19	+59	48	Qualification to promotion play-off
2	Carbomet Copșa Mică	30	17	4	9	53	32	+21	38	
3	Metalul IO Sibiu	30	15	5	10	51	29	+22	35	
4	Unirea Ocna Sibiului	30	18	1	11	42	22	+20	34 (Note: Unirea Ocna Sibiului deducted 3 points.)	
5	Vitrometan Mediaș	30	14	6	10	58	42	+16	34	
6	Relee Mediaș	30	11	9	10	28	35	−7	31	
7	Construcții Sibiu	30	11	8	11	34	26	+8	30	
8	Firul Roșu Tălmaciu	30	13	2	15	33	44	−11	28	
9	Record Mediaș	30	10	7	13	47	47	0	27	
10	ITA-Geamuri Mediaș	30	10	7	13	30	34	−4	27	
11	CFR-IUPS Sibiu	30	11	5	14	39	51	−12	27	
12	Vulturii Șura Mică	30	10	6	14	25	39	−14	26	
13	Tractorul Sibiu	30	10	5	15	31	44	−13	25	
14	Voința-Balanța Sibiu	30	8	9	13	36	53	−17	25	
15	Sparta Mediaș	30	7	7	16	27	50	−23	21	
16	Textila Mediaș	30	8	5	17	20	65	−45	21	

Rules for classification: 1) Points; 2) Goal difference; 3) Number of goals scored.
(C) Champions; (Q) Qualified for the phase indicated

=== Suceava County ===
Pos	Team	Pld	W	D	L	GF	GA	GD	Pts	Qualification or relegation
1	Rapid Stimas Suceava (C, Q)	30	20	6	4	68	27	+41	46	Qualification to promotion play-off
2	Minerul Crucea	30	18	4	8	81	37	+44	40	
3	Unirea Emil Bodnăraș	30	18	5	7	85	37	+48	39 (Note: Unirea Emil Bodnăraș, Viitorul Arbore, Stejarul Cajvana and Avântul Volovăț deducted 2 points.)	
4	Șoimii Preutești	30	16	7	7	77	45	+32	39	
5	Minerul Stulpicani	30	16	6	8	81	50	+31	34 (Note: Minerul Stulpicani, Minerul Iacobeni and Bucovina Calafindești deducted 4 points.)	
6	Recolta Fântânele	30	12	4	14	57	85	−28	28	
7	Minerul Iacobeni	30	13	4	13	60	59	+1	26	
8	Sportul Muncitoresc Metalul Suceava	30	10	6	14	54	65	−11	26	
9	Viitorul Arbore	30	12	3	15	58	65	−7	25	
10	Victoria Solca	30	12	1	17	62	79	−17	25	
11	Fuiorul Cornu Luncii	30	9	6	15	62	66	−4	24	
12	Stejarul Cajvana	30	11	4	15	55	68	−13	24	
13	Avântul Volovăț	30	9	6	15	54	63	−9	22	
14	Bucovina Calafindești	30	9	7	14	43	66	−23	21	
15	Locomotiva Dornești	30	9	6	15	47	78	−31	18 (Note: Locomotiva Dornești and Avântul Todirești deducted 6 points.)	
16	Avântul Todirești	30	9	1	20	40	94	−54	13	

Rules for classification: 1) Points; 2) Goal difference; 3) Number of goals scored.
(C) Champions; (Q) Qualified for the phase indicated

== See also ==
- 1987–88 Divizia A
- 1987–88 Divizia B
- 1987–88 Divizia C
- 1987–88 Cupa României
