= Șiria =

- Commune
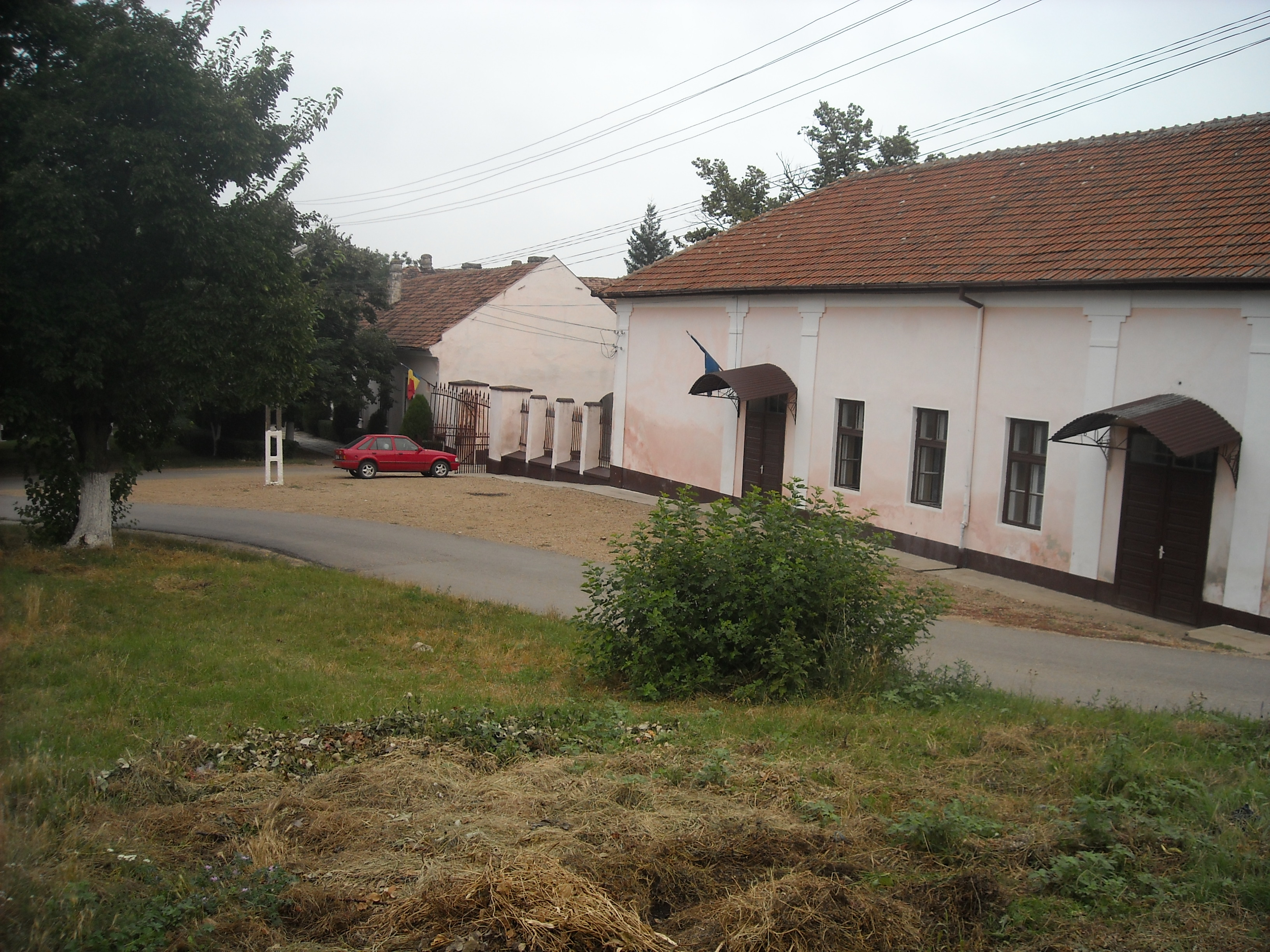
- Bohuș Mansion

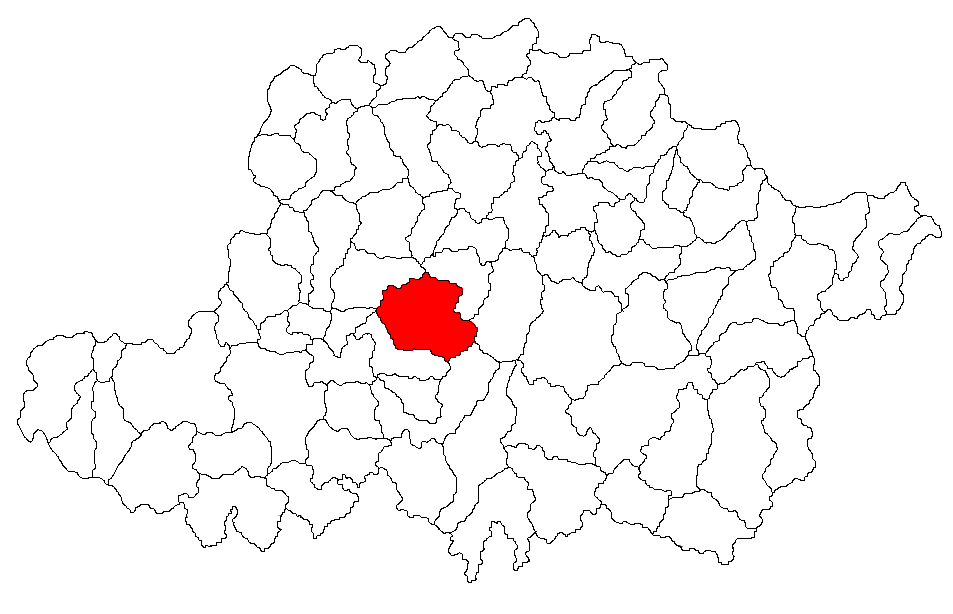
- Location in Arad County

- Location in Romania
- Coordinates: 46°16′N 21°38′E
- Country: Romania
- County: Arad
- Population (2021-12-01): 8,451
- Time zone: UTC+02:00 (EET)
  - Summer (DST): UTC+03:00 (EEST)
- Vehicle reg.: AR

Șiria (German: Hellburg; Hungarian: Világos) is a commune in Arad County, Romania. According to the 2002 census it had 8,140 inhabitants.

The commune is situated at 28 kilometres (17 mi) from Arad, its administrative territory covers 12,106 hectares (29,910 acres), and it lies in the contact zone of the Arad Plateau and the Zărand Mountains. It is composed of three villages: Galșa (Galsa), Mâsca (Muszka) and Șiria.

== Population ==
According to the last census, the population of the commune counts 8,140 inhabitants, of which 81.3% are Romanians, 4.4% Hungarians, 12.0% Gypsies, 1.8% Germans, 0.2% Ukrainians and 0.3% are of other or undeclared nationalities.

== History ==
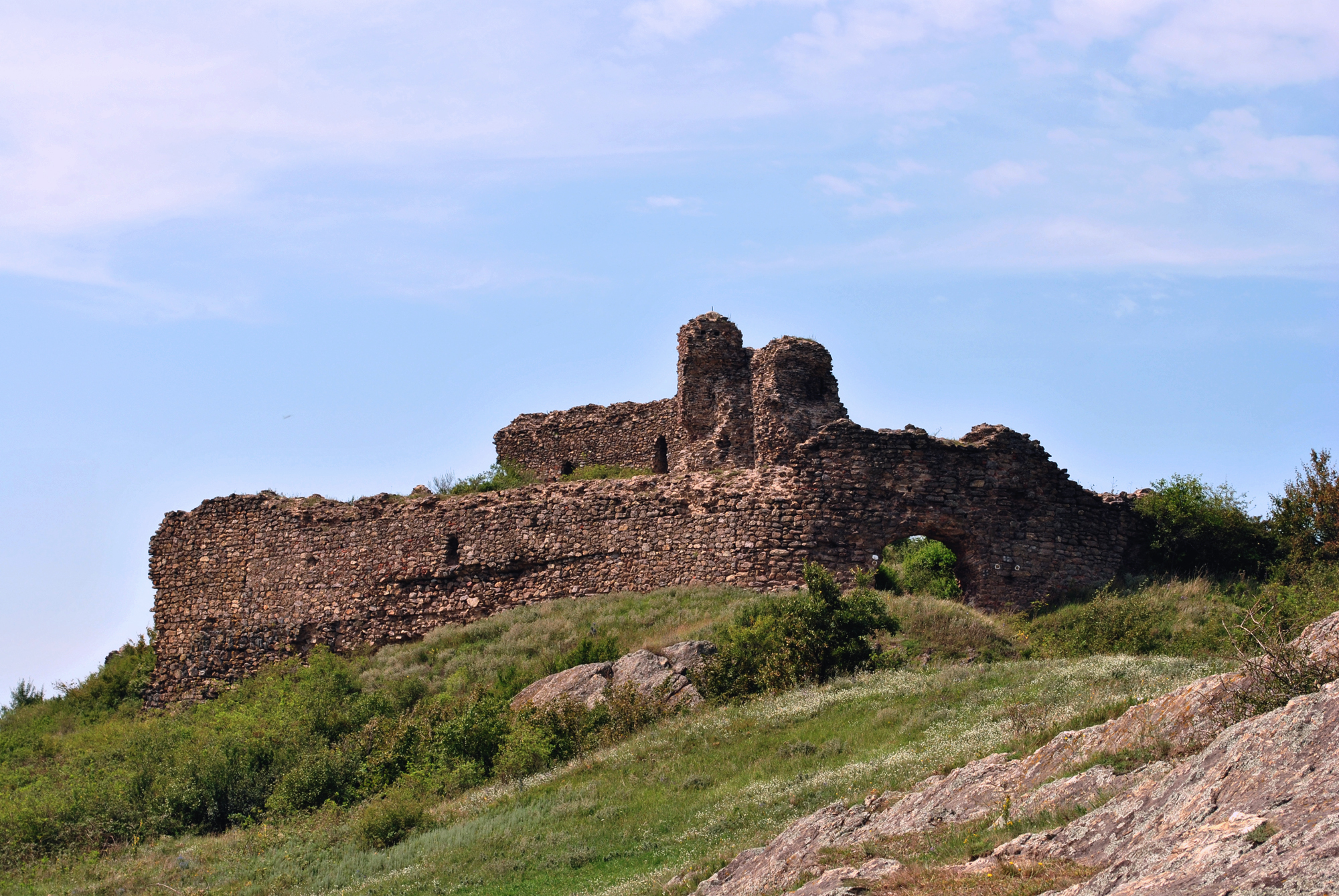
Ruins of Șiria Citadel

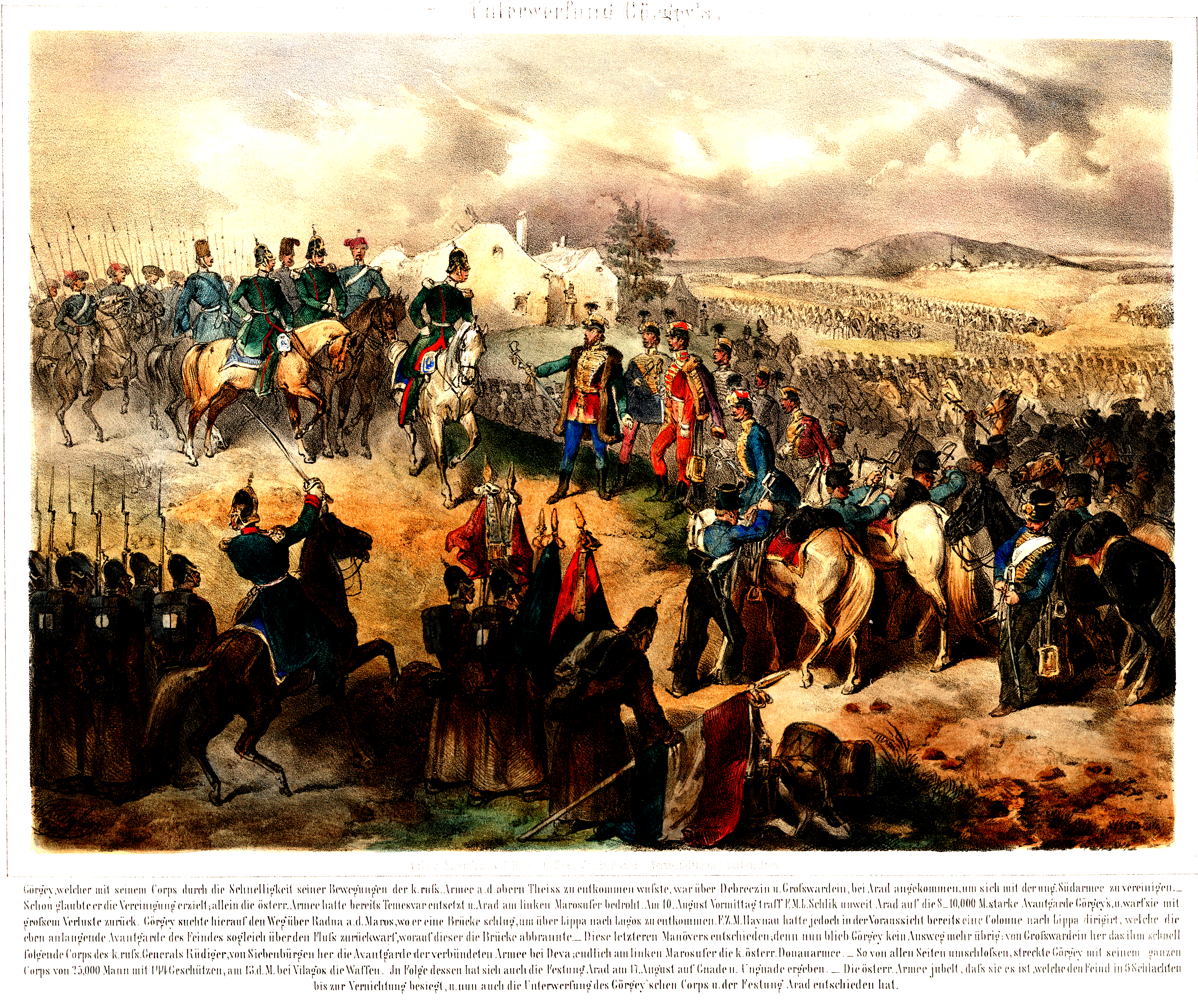
Capitulation of the Hungarian army, 1849

The first documentary record of Șiria dates back to 1169. Galșa was attested documentarily in 1202 or 1203, and Mîsca in 1331.

In 1785, it was destroyed by the troops of the Habsburg Empire.

In 1849, the village was part of the Kingdom of Hungary and it was a venue for the Revolutions of 1848 in the Habsburg areas, including the Surrender at Világos: on 13 August 1849 the Hungarian army led by Artúr Görgey surrendered to the Russian general Theodor von Rüdiger on the field below Șiria Castle, which brought an end to the Hungarian Revolution of 1848.

In 1940, demobilized Romanian soldiers withdrew to Șiria after the loss of Northern Transylvania. Here, they sang "Dac-am plecat, Ardealule, din tine", which became popular among its inhabitants.

== Economy ==
Although the economy of the commune is prevalent agricultural, the secondary and tertiary economic sectors have also developed recently. Șiria commune is known as an important viticultural centre of the region. Its resources include granite and limestone, mined in Galșa.

== Tourism ==
The ruin of Șiria's castle dates to the 13th century. Over time, it was possessed by John Hunyadi (1444), then was occupied by the rebels led by György Dózsa and it was Michael the Brave's military garrison. It was considered to be an important strategic point of the region.

Other tourist sights are the church in Șiria built between 1700 and 1750, Emil Monţia's grave, the "Adormirea Maicii Domnului" built in 1746 and the 7th-century Baroque castle in Galșa, the "Adormirea Maicii Domnului" in Mîsca dating back to 1703, and the Feredeu monastery.

== Notable people ==
The name of the commune is linked with two personalities: Ioan Slavici, Romanian writer (1848–1925) and Emil Monţia, Romanian composer. Information about them is presented by the permanent expositions of the "Ioan Slavici Memorial Museum", which is installed in the Bohuș castle, an architectural monument built in neoclassic style in 1838. In front of the museum the busts of Ioan Slavici, Mihai Eminescu, and Ioan Rusu Șirianu are situated, as well as the statue of baroness Antonia Bohuș.

== Șiria transmitter ==
Șiria transmitter (Romanian: Releul Șiria) is a facility for FM/TV-broadcasting situated at 46°15′53″N 21°39′49″E. It uses a guyed lattice steel mast with an unusually large rectangular cross section.
