= Bârsău (river) =

- Location within Romania

Location
- Country: Romania
- Counties: Maramureș County
- Villages: Valea Chioarului, Șomcuta Mare, Finteușu Mare, Satulung

Physical characteristics
- Mouth: Someș
  - location: Colțirea
  - coordinates: 47.5981°N 23.3938°E
- Length: 34 km (21 mi)
- Basin size: 164 km^{2} (63 sq mi)

Basin features
- Progression: Someș→ Tisza→ Danube→ Black Sea
- Tributaries
  - left: Curtuiuș
  - right: Ciolt, Berchezoaia, Posta

The Bârsău (Hungarian: Borszó) is a right tributary of the river Someș in Romania. It discharges into the Someș in Colțirea. Its length is 34 km (21 mi) and its basin size is 164 km^{2} (63 sq mi).
