= Adam Muszka =

Polish-French painter and sculptor

Adam Muszka (born in Piotrków Trybunalski on 4 March 1914; died in Paris in January 2005) was a Polish-French painter and sculptor, representing in his works distinctive elements of Jewish life in pre-war Poland and post-war western Europe. Several works by the artist have been sold, including 'In the Shtetl' sold at Montefiore 'Israeli & International Art' in 2011. Adam Muszka paints the vanished smalltown as he sees it, as it lives in his imagination and conception, when Adam Muszka stands at this easel and depicts that Jewish life in his canvasses, he breaks off from time to time, sits down at the piano opposite the varicoloured wall and floats off into the upper world of melody. This too he acquired from his birthplace Piotrokow, direct from his orthodox home steeped in song from generation to generation.

== History ==
Born in 1914 in Piotrków Trybunalski (Poland) to a family of synagogue cantors. At the onset of World War II in 1938, the city had a large share (ca. 50%) of Jewish residents, creating demand for famous cantors like Muszka's father, the painter's grandfather was Akiva Muszka-Ofter, his grandfather was famous not only for his voice but because of his musical compositions; He wrote many songs that amazed many other singers, Adam's father was also a singer with three of his uncles.

When Adam Muszka was 10 years old, he started to paint and he went to a Polish public school, and he was known in his young age as the kid whose father lost his voice and stopped being a singer, because of economy problems, his family moved from his natal city to Varsovia, he was the youngest of 9 kids, when he finished commercial school, he started to work in order to help his family but at the same time he studied at the City school of decorative arts.

At first, he used to paint landscapes from the places he had previously visited, later he moved to Kazimiers, where all the new artist were found before the war, after the war, Muska went back to his birth city Piotrokow just to find his house in ruins and Jews dead, the cultural department of Piotrokow asked him to paint Synagogue and it took him a lot of courage to do it because of his dad and grandfather, his art helped rebuilt the city again and bring the Jews back.

Muszka is a realist, he did not follow the standards of painting, he followed his own rules and games, he had his own individual art that helped him shape into an artist, Polish critics have crowned him with the title of "Juidica"; Adam Muszka also expresses himself in black and white, black touche on white paper. In sketching as in composition he is characterized by preciseness.

== Works ==
A large part of his works are still in private hands, but notable paintings can be found at the Jewish Historical Institute in Warsaw, the Ben Uri Gallery in London and the Lodz Museum of Art, his pictures are to be found at the Warsaw National Gallery, the Lodz Museum of Art, the collections of the Ministry of Culture, the Jewish Historical Institute and other Jewish institutions in Poland as well as in private collections abroad.
