= Marian Calafeteanu =

Romanian footballer

Personal information
- Date of birth: 8 November 1965 (age 60)
- Place of birth: Craiova, Romania
- Position: Midfielder

Senior career*
Years	Team	Apps	(Gls)
1985–1988	FC Universitatea Craiova		
1989–1994	Electroputere Craiova		
1994–1995	Hapoel Be'er Sheva		
1995–1996	Maccabi Ironi Ashdod		
1996–1997	Hapoel Bat		
1997–1998	Electroputere Craiova		
- * Club domestic league appearances and goals

Marian Calafeteanu (born 8 November 1965) is a Romanian former professional footballer who played as a midfielder.
