= Șomcuta Mare =

- Town
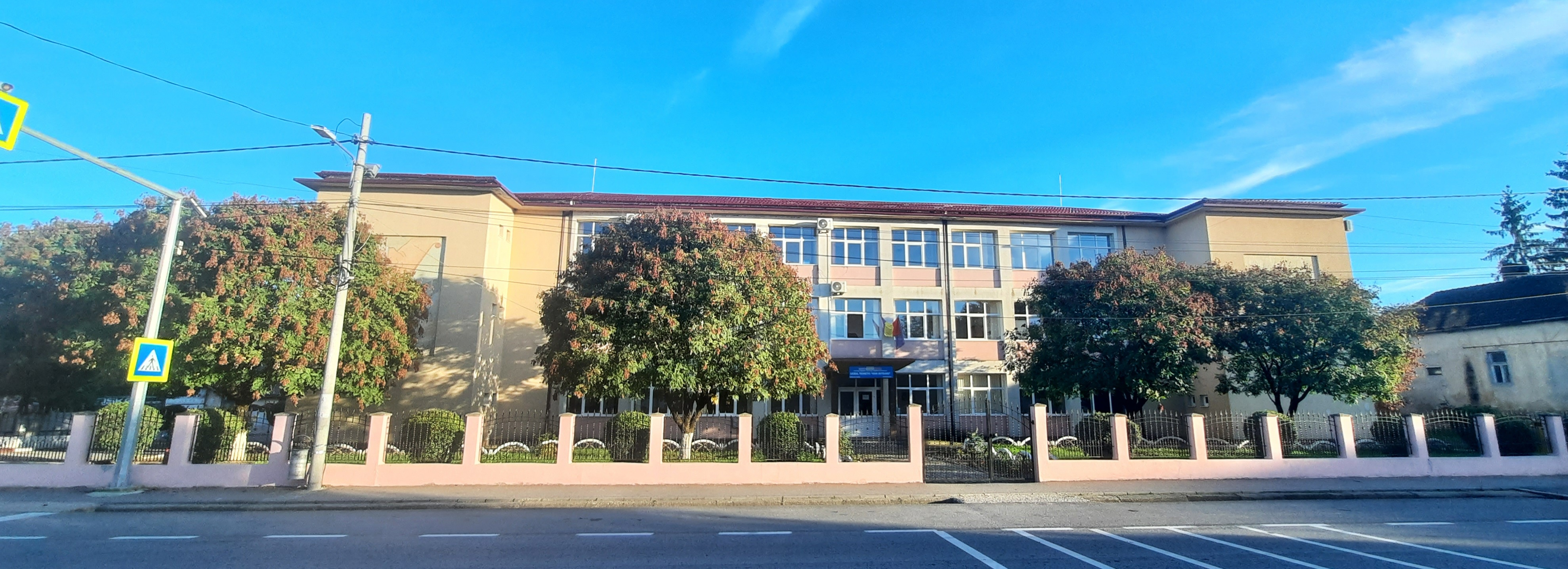
- Ioan Buteanu High School

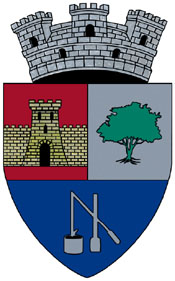
- Coat of arms

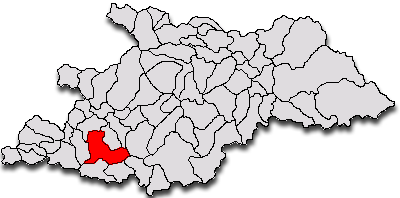
- Location in Maramureș County

- Location in Romania
- Coordinates: 47°31′N 23°28′E
- Country: Romania
- County: Maramureș

Government
  - Mayor (2024–2028): Gheorghe-Ioan Buda (PSD)
- Area: 120.40 km^{2} (46.49 sq mi)
- Elevation: 220 m (720 ft)
- Population (2021-12-01): 7,703
  - Density: 63.98/km^{2} (165.7/sq mi)
- Time zone: UTC+02:00 (EET)
  - Summer (DST): UTC+03:00 (EEST)
- Postal code: 437335
- Area code: (+40) 02 62
- Vehicle reg.: MM
- Website: www.somcutamare.ro

Șomcuta Mare (Hungarian: Nagysomkút; German: Großhorn; Yiddish: שאָמקוט, romanized: Shomkut) is a town in Maramureș County, Romania. The town administers seven villages: Buciumi (Törökfalu), Buteasa (Bucsonfalva), Ciolt (Csolt), Codru Butesii (Kodrulytelep), Finteușu Mare (Nagyfentős), Hovrila (Hávord), and Vălenii Șomcutei (Somkútpataka). It was declared a town in 2004.

== History ==
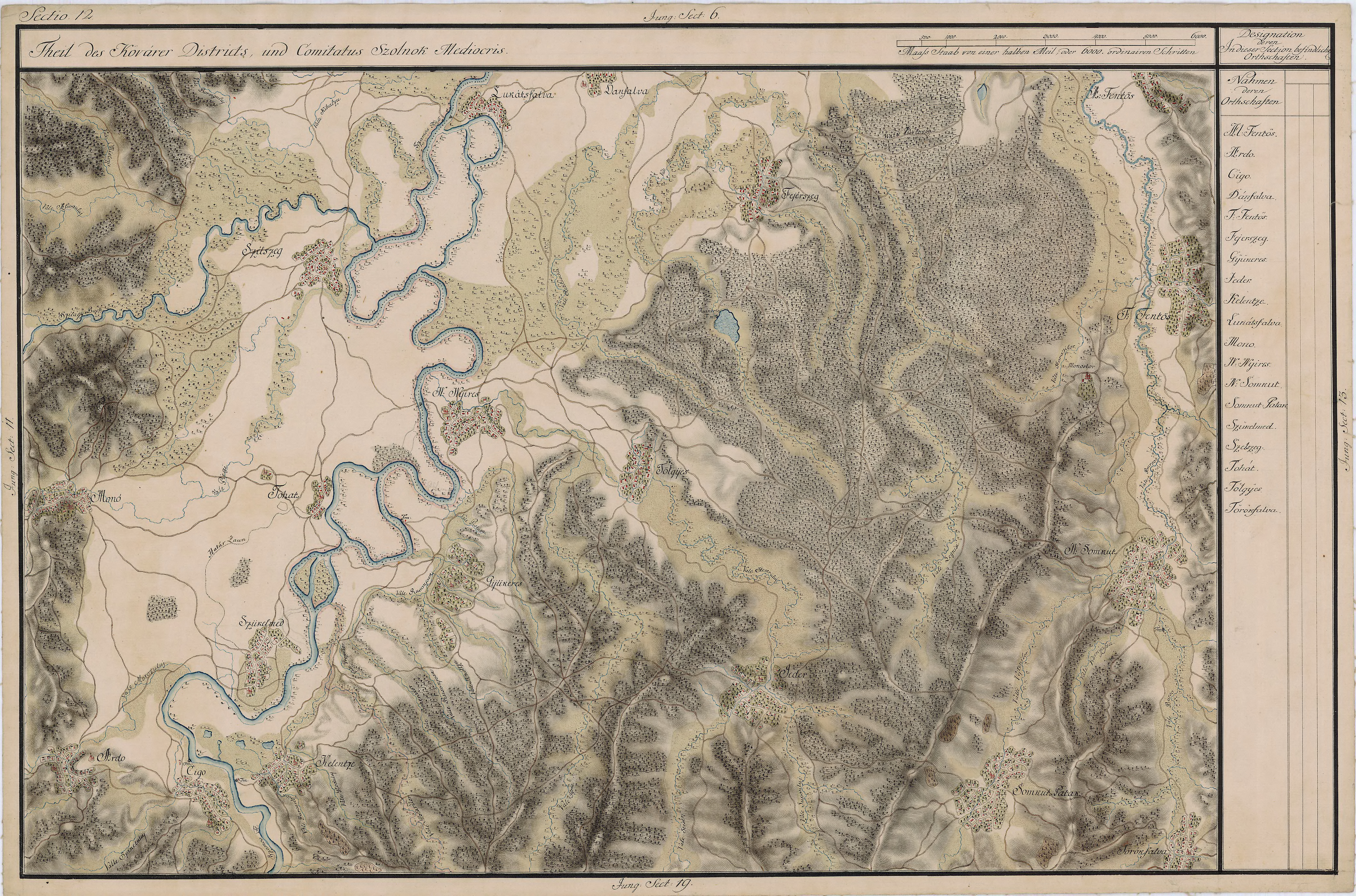
Șomcuta Mare on the Josephine Map of Transylvania

The exact founding date of Șomcuta Mare is unknown; however, it is first mentioned in 1319 as part of Cetatea de piatră (Stone Fortress) realm. In the 14th century, the locality, along with the Chioar Domain enters the possession of Romanian voivodes (rulers) of the Voivodeship of Maramureș. As of 1566, the Chioar Domain is divided in 12 voivodeships, of which those led by voivode Dan Butean are administered from Șomcuta Mare, covering 14 villages. In the year of 1599 Șomcuta Mare along with the remaining Chioar Domain is transferred to the rule of Mihai Viteazul.

In 1713 Cetatea de piatră is destroyed. Later, in 1738, the Chioar Domain is transformed into a Ținut (Land of), leading to an increased administrative importance of Șomcuta Mare. With the help of Gheorghe Șincai a school is founded in the year of 1784; a primary school is opened between 1835–1838 and a girl school between 1867–1889.

At the end of the 19th century the locality becomes an important trading point, with well established markets. The area had 3 operating banks: Casa de Economii a Districtului Chioar (Savings House of Chioar District), Casa de Economii Chioreană (Chiorean House of Savings), and Banca de Comerț (Commerce Bank); as well as a train station, post office, telegraph, library, and fireman house.

During the inter-war oil presses, mills, and 3 leather processing factories operate in the area as well as an agriculture school is opened. Between 1922 and 1929 a gymnasium was opened. In 1930–1931 the newspaper "Chioar" was published. After World War II, the locality reached a higher urbanisation level. Its status was changed from commune to town in 2004.

== Geography ==
Șomcuta Mare belongs to the Baia Mare metropolitan area. It is located in the southwestern part of Maramureș County, 25 km (16 mi) from the county seat, Baia Mare. The town is crossed by national road DN1C (part of European route E58), which runs from Cluj-Napoca north towards Baia Mare and the border crossing at Halmeu, where it connects with the Ukrainian highway M26.

The town lies on the banks of Lăpuș River right tributary, the Bârsău; the river Berchezoaia flows into the Bârsău near Finteușu Mare village. Șomcuta Mare covers an area of 12,040 ha (29,800 acres), of which 7,949 ha are agricultural land (arable land 2,799 ha, pastures 1,855 ha, hay fields 2,585 ha, vineyards 5 ha, orchards 705 ha) and 4,091 ha non-agricultural land (forests 3,177 ha, water 107 ha, roads 201 ha, buildings 517 ha, vacant land 89 ha).

== Demographics ==
Historical population
Year	Pop.	±%
1880	5,675	—
1900	6,731	+18.6%
1910	7,459	+10.8%
1930	7,416	−0.6%
1956	8,227	+10.9%
1977	8,502	+3.3%
1992	8,079	−5.0%
2002	7,708	−4.6%
2011	7,455	−3.3%
2021	7,703	+3.3%
Source: Census data

At the 2021 census, Șomcuta Mare had 7,703 inhabitants, of which 76.72% were Romanians, 14.53% Hungarians and 1.09% Roma. At the 2011 census, the town's population was 8,079. At the 2002 census, the town's population was 7,708, of which: 6,810 Romanians, 167 Hungarians, 3 Germans, 3 Italians, 1 Ukrainian, 1 Jew, and 1 Serbian; compared against the 1992 census, the population declined from 8,079.

== Culture ==
In the village of Finteușu Mare, a male choir was established on 1 December 1918, when the assembly of the delegates of ethnic Romanians declared the Union of Transylvania with Romania, which included most of the Maramureș region. As of 2015, the choir was still interpreting the Romanian patriotic song "Dac-am plecat, Ardealule, din tine", composed as a reaction to the 1940 Second Vienna Award, where arbiters Nazi Germany and Fascist Italy assigned Northern Transylvania, including Maramureș, back to Hungary.

== Natives ==
- Ioan Buteanu, leader of Romanian revolutionaries in 1848
- Zoltán Felvinczi Takács (1880–1964), art historian
- Ben Ferencz (1920–2023), chief prosecutor at one of the Nuremberg Trials

== Education ==
In the town there are currently 3 kindergartens, 4 elementary schools, 3 gymnasiums, and one secondary school: the Ioan Buteanu Theoretical High School.

== Sports ==
CS Progresul Șomcuta Mare is a football team based in the town. The team currently competes in the Liga IV – Maramureș County, the fourth tier of the Romanian football, following the relegation at end of the 2021–22 season.

== Tourism ==
- The Nature Reserve Peștera Vălenii Șomcutei (Vălenii Șomcutei Cave) covers 5 ha (12 acres).
