= Remetea Chioarului =

- Commune
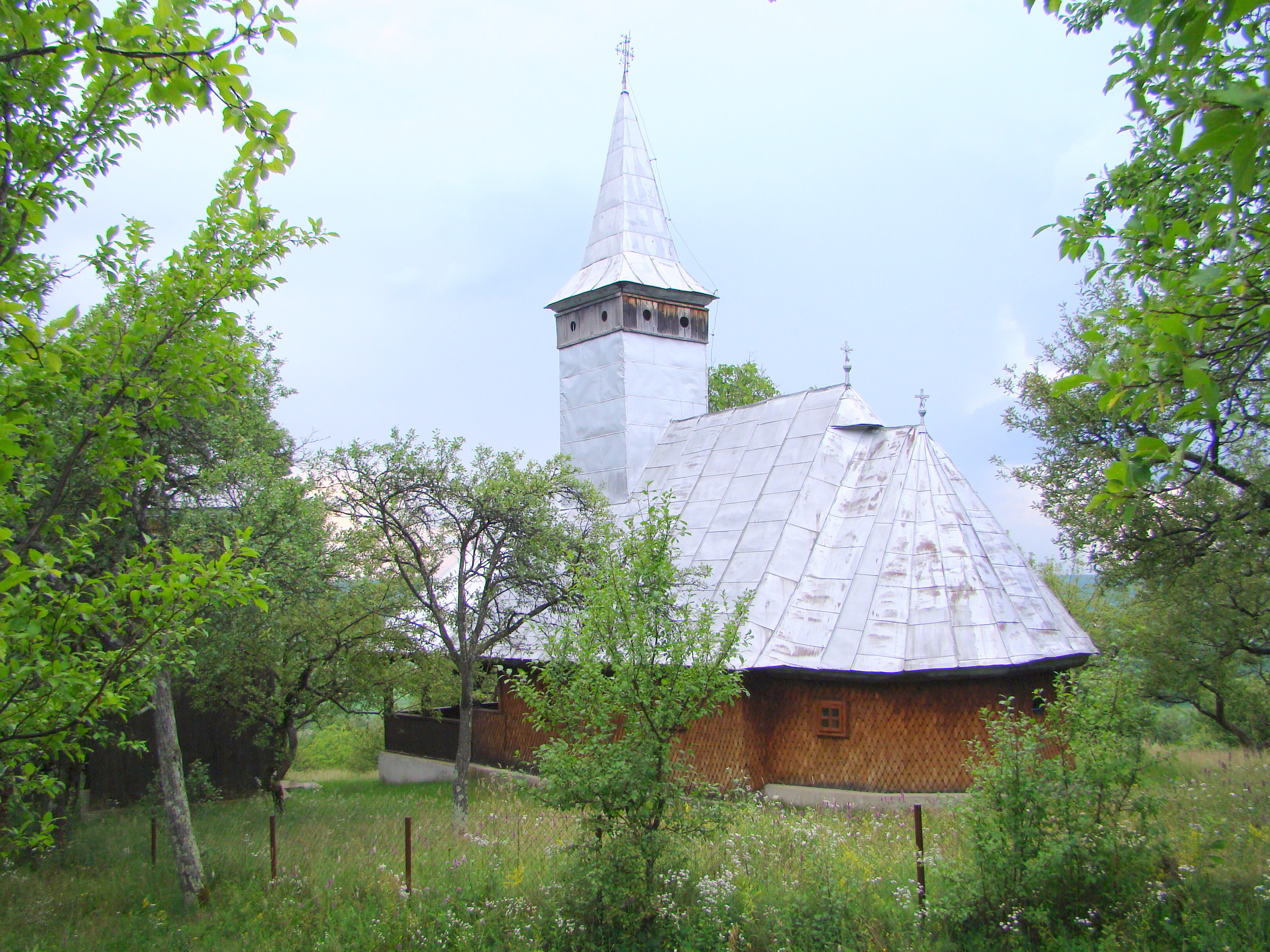
- Wooden church in Remecioara

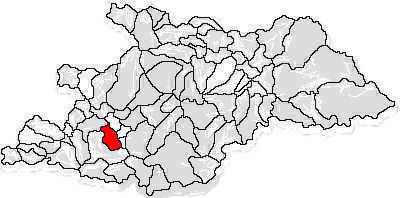
- Location in Maramureș County

- Location in Romania
- Coordinates: 47°32′N 23°33′E
- Country: Romania
- County: Maramureș

Government
  - Mayor (2024–2028): Călin Ovidiu Petrică (PSD)
- Area: 50.96 km^{2} (19.68 sq mi)
- Elevation: 202 m (663 ft)
- Population (2021-12-01): 2,898
  - Density: 56.87/km^{2} (147.3/sq mi)
- Time zone: UTC+02:00 (EET)
  - Summer (DST): UTC+03:00 (EEST)
- Postal code: 437230
- Area code: +(40) 262
- Vehicle reg.: MM
- Website: remeteachioarului.ro

Remetea Chioarului (Hungarian: Kővárremete) is a commune in Maramureș County, Romania. It is composed of five villages: Berchez (Magyarberkesz), Berchezoaia (Berkeszpataka), Posta (Pusztafentős), Remecioara (Kisremete), and Remetea Chioarului.

Chioar fortress is located near Berchezoaia village.

Historical population
Year	Pop.	±%
1880	2,485	—
1900	2,780	+11.9%
1910	2,890	+4.0%
1930	2,973	+2.9%
1956	3,254	+9.5%
1977	3,277	+0.7%
1992	3,022	−7.8%
2002	3,003	−0.6%
2011	2,834	−5.6%
2021	2,898	+2.3%
Source: Census data
