= CS Progresul Șomcuta Mare =

Romanian football team

Progresul Șomcuta Mare
- Full name: Clubul Sportiv Progresul Șomcuta Mare
- Nicknames: Alb-Albaștrii (The White and Blues); Șomcutenii (The people from Șomcuta Mare); Progresiștii (The Progressive People)
- Short name: Șomcuta
- Founded: 1970; 56 years ago
- Ground: Progresul
- Capacity: 400
- Owner: Șomcuta Mare Town
- Chairman: Ionuț Buhai
- Manager: Dan Mircea
- League: Liga IV
- 2025–26: Liga IV, Maramureș County, 3rd of 14
Home colours	Away colours	Third colours

Clubul Sportiv Progresul Șomcuta Mare, commonly known as Progresul Șomcuta Mare, is a Romanian football team based in Șomcuta Mare, Maramureș County, which currently competes in the Liga IV – Maramureș County, the fourth tier of the Romanian football, following the relegation at end of the 2021–22 season.

== History ==
=== First years and ascencion (1970–1999) ===
After four seasons of territorial championships (fifth tier), fifteen seasons of County Championship and two lost promotion matches, in the 1996–97 season (0–4 with Victoria Carei) and 1997–98 season (2–4 with Electromureș Târgu Mureș), Progresul managed to promoted to 3rd division, without promotion play-off match, at end of the 1998–99 season.

=== First period in Liga III (1999–2002) ===
In the first season in Divizia C, Progresul finished 12th in the Series VI and reached the first round of Cupa României, where lost in front of first division side FCM Bacău, 0–1 after extra-time.

Renamed as Liber Humana, the ”white and blues” team finished the 2000–01 season in the 5th place. The next season saw the team from Șomcuta Mare finished in 8th place, but the club withdrew after 23 rounds and was relegated at the end of the season.

=== Struggles to promote (2002–2019) ===
Reorganized in the Maramureș County Championship, Progresul spent the next two decades struggling for the comeback to 3rd division, always being at the top of the South Series, but without much success.

=== Promotion to Liga III and relegation back (2019–present) ===
Progresul Șomcuta Mare promoted to Liga III in the 2019–20 season, beating CSM Sighetu Marmației in the Liga IV Maramureș championship final (1–1 and 6–5 at penalty shoot-out) and Sportul Șimleu Silvaniei, the Liga IV – Sălaj County winner, 2–0 in the only match of Group B of the promotion play-off.

In the 2020–21 Liga III season finished 9th, missing out safety due to goal difference against CSM Satu Mare, who finished 8th, avoiding relegation after the promotion/relegation tie against CSM Sighetu Marmației (3–1 at Șomcuta Mare and 3–1 Sighetu Marmației).

Progresul relegated at end of the 2021–22 season finishing in 9th place in the Series X.

== Grounds ==
The club plays its home matches on Progresul Stadium, located in Șomcuta Mare, Maramureș County, who has a capacity of 500 seats.

== Honours ==
Liga IV – Maramureș County

- Winners (4): 1996–97, 1997–98, 1998–99, 2019–20

Cupa României – Maramureș County

- Winners (2): 2017, 2019

== Club Officials ==
=== Board of directors ===
Role	Name
Owner	(Romania) Șomcuta Mare Town
President	(Romania) Ionuț Buhai
Vice-President	(Romania) Adrian Grama
Secretary	(Romania) Alexandru Buhai

=== Current technical staff ===
Role	Name
Manager	(Romania) Dan Mircea
Goalkeeping Coach	(Romania) Marius Marian

== Notable former players ==
The footballers mentioned below have played at least 1 season for Progresul and also played in Liga I for another team.

- (Romania) Simion Mironaș
- (Romania) Romulus Buia
- (Romania) Paul Batin

== Former managers ==
- (Romania) Daniel Sabou

== League history ==
Season	Tier	Division	Place	Notes	Cupa României
2023–24	4	Liga IV (MM) (South Series)	1st		County phase
2022–23	4	Liga IV (MM) (South Series)	3rd		County phase
2021–22	3	Liga III (Seria X)	9th	Relegated	Second round
2020–21	3	Liga III (Seria X)	9th		County phase
2019–20	4	Liga IV (MM) (South Series)	1st (C)	Promoted	First round
2018–19	4	Liga IV (MM) (South Series)	2nd		County phase
2017–18	4	Liga IV (MM) (South Series)	4th		Second round
2016–17	4	Liga IV (MM) (South Series)	3rd		County phase

Season	Tier	Division	Place	Notes	Cupa României
2015–16	4	Liga IV (MM) (South Series)	3rd		County phase
2014–15	4	Liga IV (MM) (South Series)	7th		County phase
2013–14	4	Liga IV (MM) (South Series)	4th		County phase
2012–13	4	Liga IV (MM) (South Series)	3rd		County phase
2011–12	4	Liga IV (MM) (South Series)	3rd		County phase
2010–11	4	Liga IV (MM) (South Series)	1st		County phase
2009–10	4	Liga IV (MM) (South Series)	4th		County phase
2008–09	4	Liga IV (MM) (South Series)	4th		County phase
