= Valea Chioarului =

- Commune
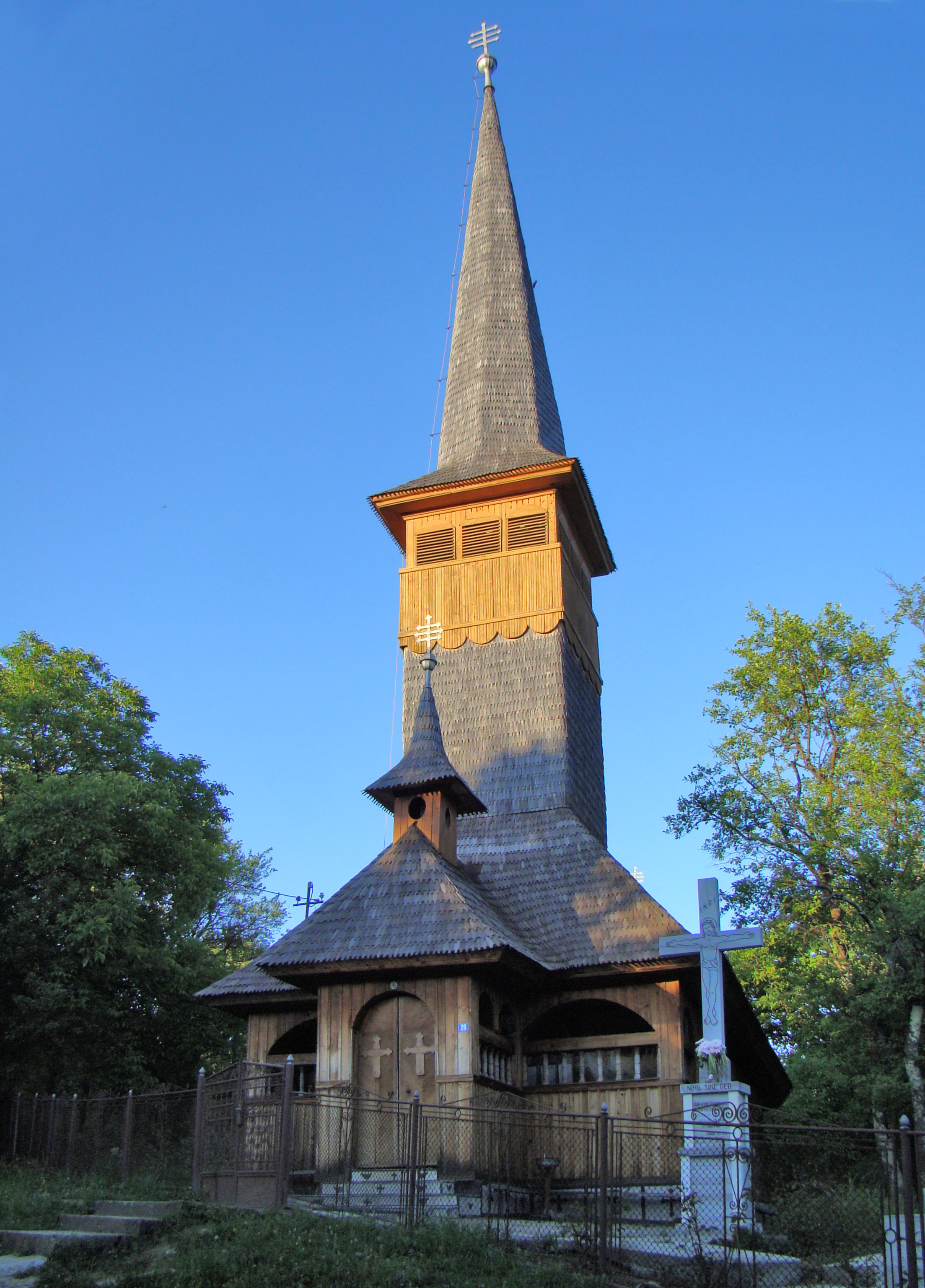
- Wooden church in Vărai

- Location in Maramureș County

- Location in Romania
- Coordinates: 47°26′N 23°29′E
- Country: Romania
- County: Maramureș

Government
  - Mayor (2020–2024): Ioan Sorin Burde (PSD)
- Area: 79.08 km^{2} (30.53 sq mi)
- Elevation: 299 m (981 ft)
- Population (2021-12-01): 2,002
  - Density: 25.32/km^{2} (65.57/sq mi)
- Time zone: UTC+02:00 (EET)
  - Summer (DST): UTC+03:00 (EEST)
- Postal code: 437370
- Area code: +40 x59
- Vehicle reg.: MM
- Website: www.valeachioarului.ro

Valea Chioarului (Hungarian: Kővárgara) is a commune in Maramureș County, Romania. It is composed of six villages: Curtuiușu Mare (Nagykörtvélyes), Durușa (Durusa), Fericea (Szamosfericse), Mesteacăn (Kisnyíres), Valea Chioarului, and Vărai (Kőváralja).

The commune is located in the southwestern part of Maramureș County, 34 km (21 mi) from the county seat, Baia Mare, on the border with Sălaj County. It lies at an altitude of about 300 m (980 ft), on the banks of the river Bârsău.

Valea Chioarului is crossed by national road DN1C (part of European route E58), which runs from Cluj-Napoca north towards Baia Mare and the Ukrainian border at Halmeu.

Historical population
Year	Pop.	±%
1880	3,450	—
1900	3,696	+7.1%
1910	3,772	+2.1%
1930	3,565	−5.5%
1956	3,530	−1.0%
1977	3,188	−9.7%
1992	2,600	−18.4%
2002	2,288	−12.0%
2011	2,025	−11.5%
2021	2,002	−1.1%
Source: Census data

== Gallery ==
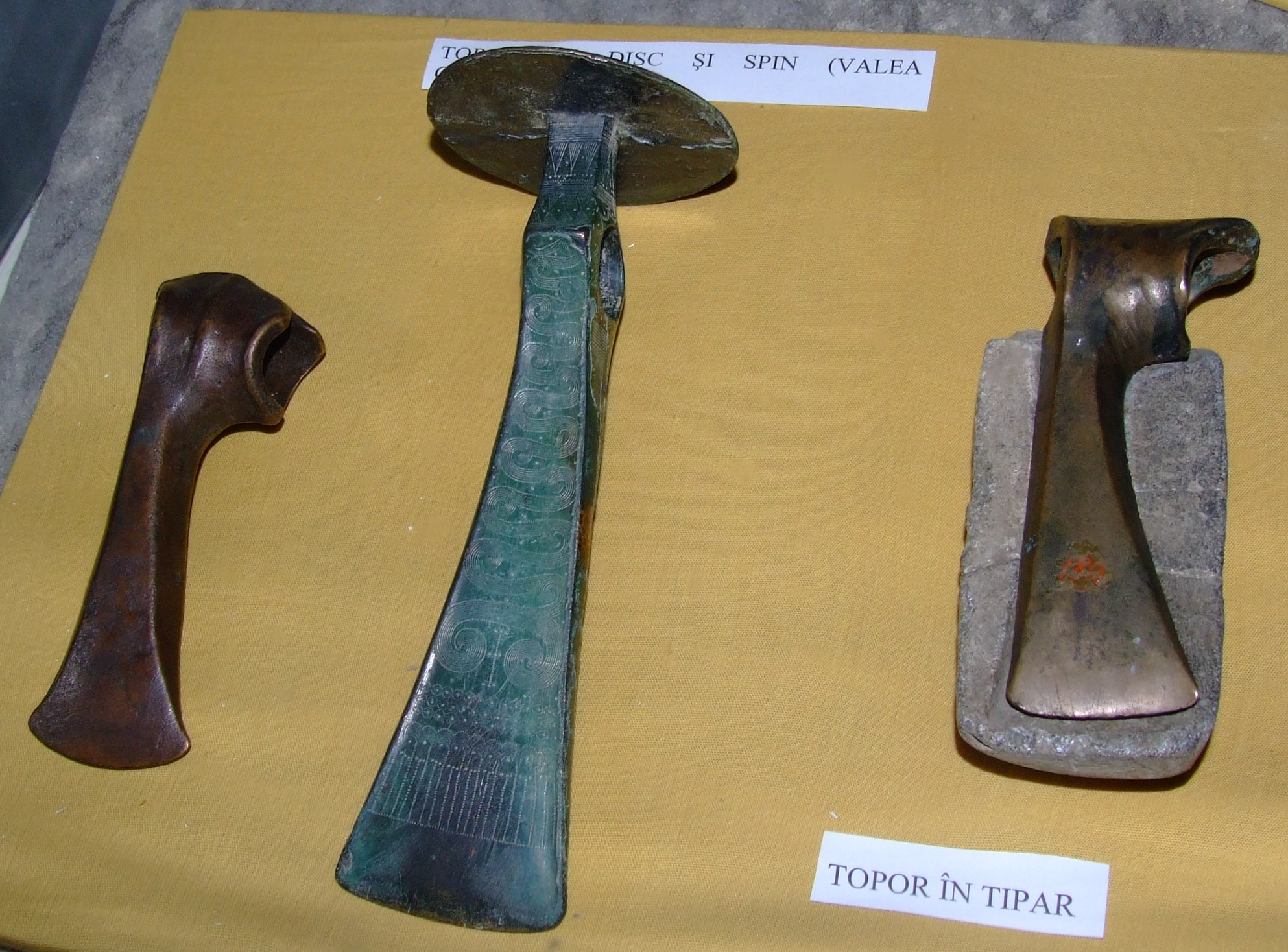
Wietenberg culture (3800–1200 BC) battle axes found at Valea Chioarului. In display at the National Museum of Transylvanian History, Cluj-Napoca

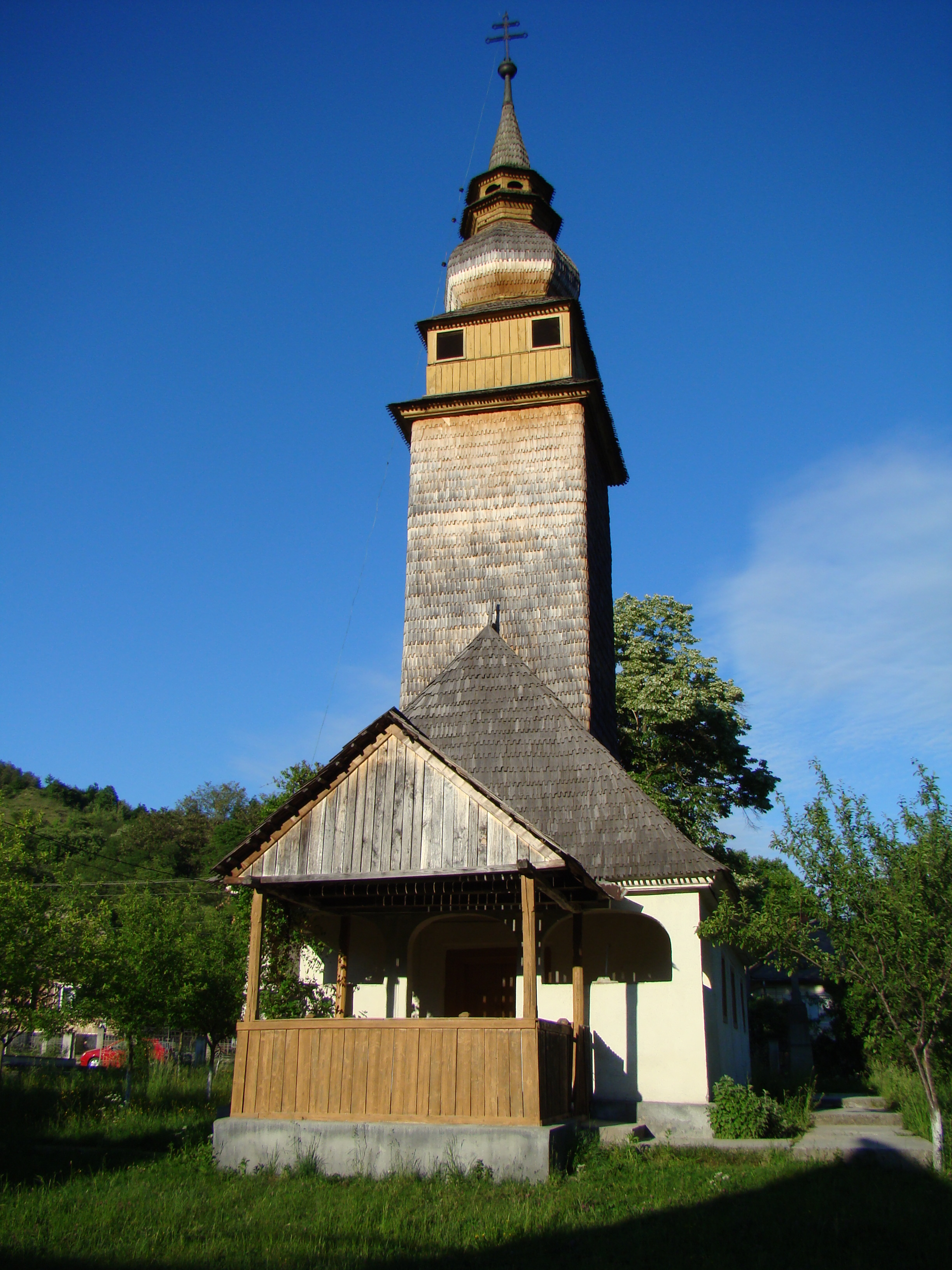
Wooden church in Valea Chioarului

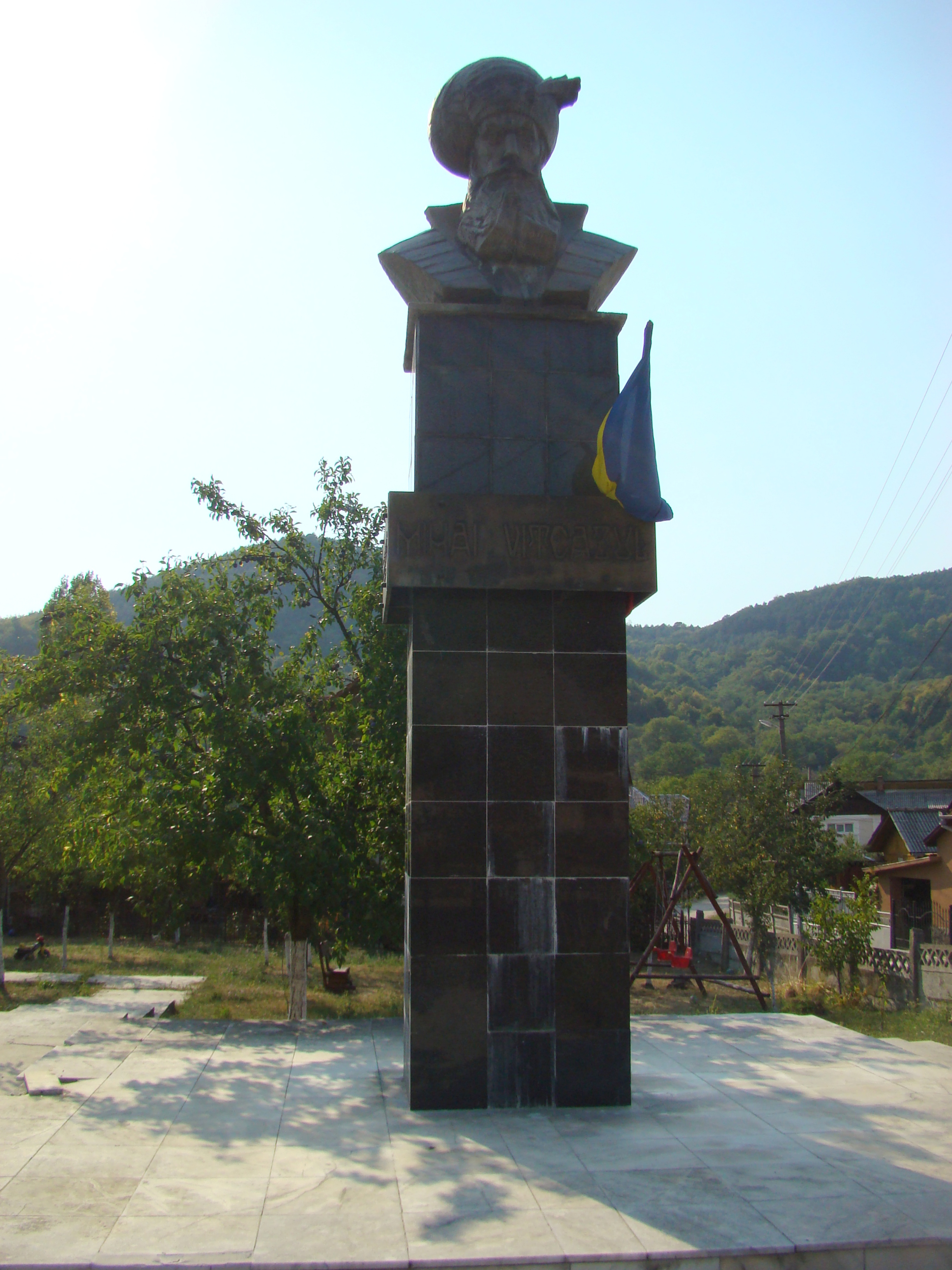
Bust of Michael the Brave in Valea Chioarului

== See also ==
- Wietenberg culture
