= Baia Mare metropolitan area =

Coordinates: 47.6500°N 23.5667°E

Baia Mare Metropolitan Area Zona Metropolitana Baia Mare (in Romanian)
- Metropolitan area
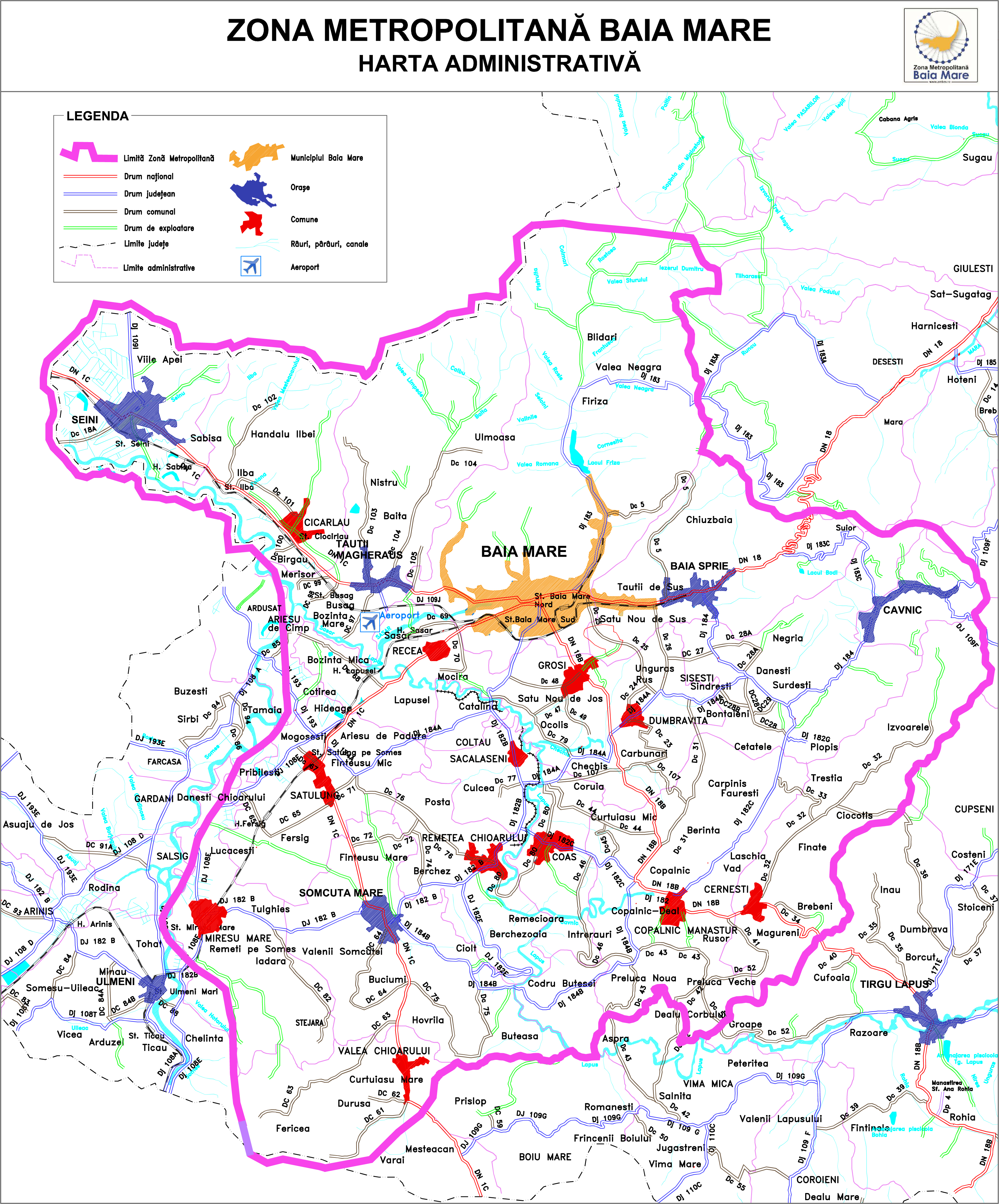
- Interactive map of Baia Mare Metropolitan Area
- County: Maramureș
- Country: Romania

Area
  - Total: 1,410 km^{2} (540 sq mi)

Population (2015)
  - Total: 245,171
  - Density: 174/km^{2} (450/sq mi)
- Time zone: UTC+2 (EET)
  - Summer (DST): UTC+3 (EEST)
- Website: www.zmbm.ro

Baia Mare Metropolitan Area (BMMA) is located in northwestern Romania and consists of Baia Mare City (Maramureș County seat) and localities found within a distance of 35 km (22 mi).

For the 2014–2020 time period, the Baia Mare Metropolitan Area was slated to become an important instrument for accessing EU structural funds, which would enable the implementation of local infrastructure investment projects, thereby increasing the quality of life and reducing disparities between localities.

As defined by Eurostat, the Baia Mare functional urban area has a population of 181,993 residents (as of 2015).

== Territorial context ==
BMMA covers an area of 1,410 square kilometers (22% of Maramureș County), having specific landforms (mountainous area of Gutâi Mountains, the lowland and hills of Baia Mare) with the Someș River and its tributaries (Lăpuș and Săsar Rivers) crossing it.

== Subdivisions ==
Baia Mare Metropolitan Area is an intercommunity development association (IDA), made up of 19 localities, with Baia Mare City being in the centre. It includes the towns of Baia Sprie, Cavnic, Seini, Șomcuta Mare, and Tăuții-Măgherăuș, as well as 13 communes: Cernești, Cicârlău, Coaș, Coltău, Copalnic-Mănăștur, Dumbrăvița, Groși, Mireșu Mare, Recea, Remetea Chioarului, Satulung, Săcălășeni, and Valea Chioarului. The population of the metropolitan area exceeds 245,171 inhabitants, most of whom reside in Baia Mare City. The city, through the diversity of economic and cultural activities, affects surrounding communities. Also, in terms of economic development, surrounding localities provide land and labor force for entrepreneurs who want to develop their businesses or bring new investments to the area. The aim of the metropolitan area is to support the development of the city and neighboring localities based on a common vision to bring benefits for all the residents.

The objectives of the Baia Mare Metropolitan Area are:

- Improving the quality of life and reducing territorial, social and economic disparities through implementation of programs and projects funded from national and European funds.
- Creating a metropolitan pole around Baia Mare City, attracting direct investment, creating jobs and expanding the public transportation system throughout the metropolitan area.

== Projects and programmes ==
Implemented projects:

- Urban Network Project funded through the "Administrative Capacity Development" Programme, began in 2009 and has a 12 month implementation period. Training modules were held through the project for public procurement, computer skills, foreign language classes, project development and management, found in the area of intervention 1.3 - Improving organizational effectiveness, Priority Axis 1 - Improvement in structure and process of public policies from the "Administrative Capacity Development" Programme.
- TRANS URBAN Project — Updating the strategy of the Baia Mare Urban System by integrating local development strategies of the member localities. The project started on the 16th of June 2010 with a 12 months implementation.
- USE ACT Project - Urban Sustainable Environmental Actions, in partnership with Naples (Italy), Athens (Greece), Barakaldo (Spain), and Dublin (Ireland).
- Network of active employment measures in 15 administrative units in the North - West Development Region, with The Federation of NGOs as applicant and Baia Mare Metropolitan Area as partner.
- STATUS - Strategic Territorial Agendas for „Small and Middle-Sized Towns Project funded through the Transnational Cooperation Programme South East Europe, Priority Axis 4.1 - Addressing problems affecting metropolitan areas and regional systems of settlements.
- INTER_URBAN Project — Crossborder database with indicators for monitoring the sustainable development process in Baia Mare and Ivano Frankivsk Areas, with BMMA being the applicant and Ivano Frankivsk, Ukraine being partner in association with Global Indicators Facility from Toronto, Canada.

Implementing programmes:

- Metropolitan Transport System, having as main purpose the implementation of the local public transport service for people within the Baia Mare Metropolitan Area. The programme is addressed to more than 245.671 inhabitants.

== See also ==
- Metropolitan areas in Romania
