= Bloaja =

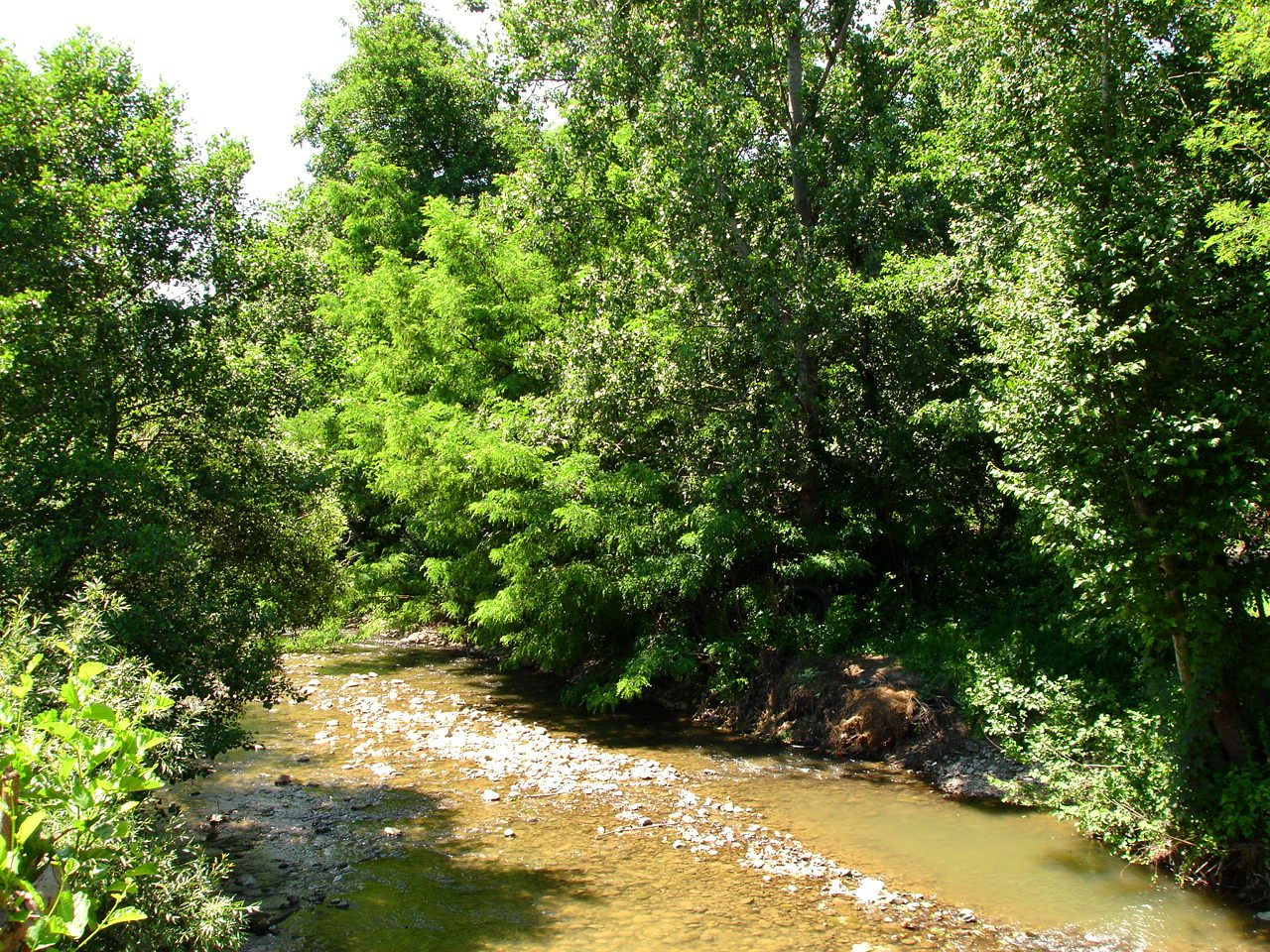

- Location within Romania

Location
- Country: Romania
- Counties: Maramureș County
- Villages: Izvoarele, Ciocotiș, Fânațe, Cernești, Rușor

Physical characteristics
- Source: Țibleș Mountains
- Mouth: Cavnic
  - location: Copalnic-Mănăștur
  - coordinates: 47.5097°N 23.6829°E
- Length: 27 km (17 mi)
- Basin size: 92 km^{2} (36 sq mi)

Basin features
- Progression: Cavnic→ Lăpuș→ Someș→ Tisza→ Danube→ Black Sea

The Bloaja is a left tributary of the river Cavnic in Romania. It flows into the Cavnic in Copalnic-Mănăștur. Its length is 27 km (17 mi), and its basin size is 92 km^{2} (36 sq mi).
