= Dombhát =

Dombhát is the Hungarian name for three villages in Romania:

- Anieş village, Maieru Commune, Bistriţa-Năsăud County
- Dealu Mare village, Coroieni Commune, Maramureș County
- Dealu Corbului village, Vima Mică Commune, Maramureș County
