= Strâmbul Băiuț =

- Location within Romania

Location
- Country: Romania
- Counties: Maramureș County

Physical characteristics
- Source: Mount Măgura Leordei
  - location: Lăpuș Mountains
  - coordinates: 47°38′23″N 23°57′10″E
  - elevation: 937 m (3,074 ft)
- Mouth: Lăpuș
  - location: Strâmbu-Băiuț
  - coordinates: 47°35′43″N 23°58′45″E
  - elevation: 525 m (1,722 ft)
- Length: 9 km (5.6 mi)
- Basin size: 32 km^{2} (12 sq mi)

Basin features
- Progression: Lăpuș→ Someș→ Tisza→ Danube→ Black Sea

The Strâmbul Băiuț is a right tributary of the river Lăpuș in Romania. It flows into the Lăpuș in the village Strâmbu-Băiuț. Its length is 9 km (5.6 mi) and its basin size is 32 km^{2} (12 sq mi).
