= Nistru (disambiguation) =

Nistru may refer to:

- the Romanian name for the river Dniester
- Nistru (Someș), a river in Maramureș County, Romania
- Nistru, a village in the town Tăuții-Măgherăuș, Maramureș County, Romania
