= Cavnic (river) =

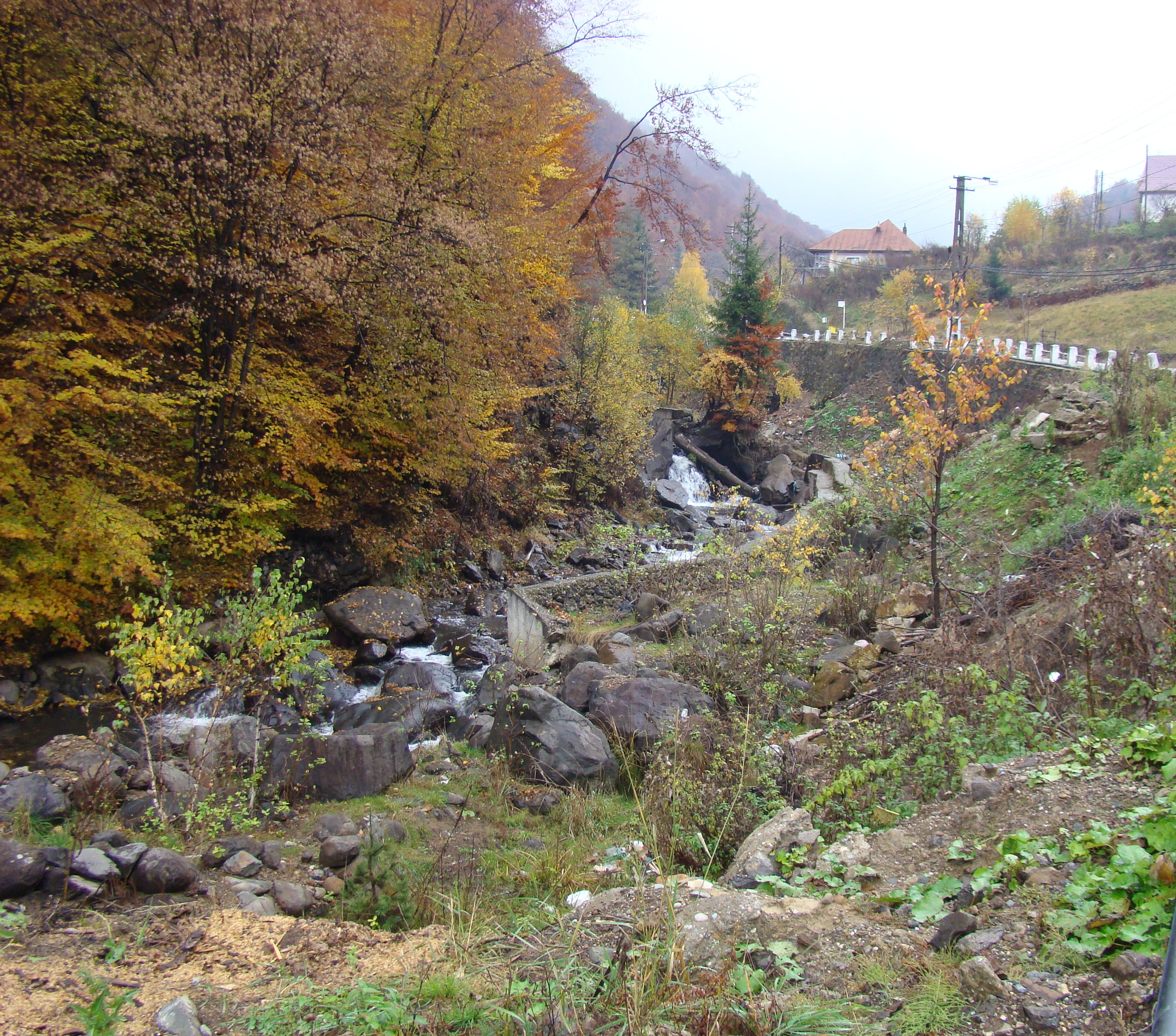

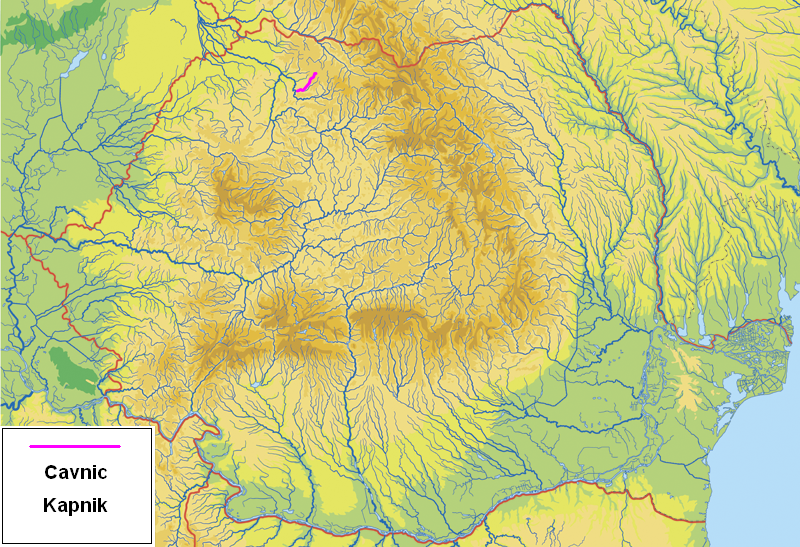

Location
- Country: Romania
- Counties: Maramureș County
- Villages: Cavnic, Copalnic-Mănăștur

Physical characteristics
- Source: Țibleș Mountains
- Mouth: Lăpuș
  - coordinates: 47.5032°N 23.5937°E
- Length: 37 km (23 mi)
- Basin size: 256 km^{2} (99 sq mi)

Basin features
- Progression: Lăpuș→ Someș→ Tisza→ Danube→ Black Sea

The Cavnic is a right tributary of the river Lăpuș in Maramureș County, Romania. It discharges into the Lăpuș at Întrerâuri, near Copalnic-Mănăștur. Its length is 37 km (23 mi) and its basin size is 256 km^{2} (99 sq mi).

== Tributaries ==
The following rivers are tributaries to the river Cavnic:

- Left: Bloaja
- Right: Valea Gutâiului, Berința
