= Berința =

- Location within Romania

Location
- Country: Romania
- Counties: Maramureș County
- Villages: Cărpiniș, Berința, Copalnic

Physical characteristics
- Mouth: Cavnic
  - location: Copalnic-Deal
  - coordinates: 47.5131°N 23.6453°E
- Length: 11 km (6.8 mi)
- Basin size: 31 km^{2} (12 sq mi)

Basin features
- Progression: Cavnic→ Lăpuș→ Someș→ Tisza→ Danube→ Black Sea

The Berința is a right tributary of the river Cavnic in Romania. It flows into the Cavnic at Copalnic-Deal. Its length is 11 km (6.8 mi) and its basin size is 31 km^{2} (12 sq mi).
