= Botiz (disambiguation) =

Botiz may refer to the following places in Romania:

- Botiz, a commune in Satu Mare County
- Botiz (Lăpuș), a river in Maramureș County, tributary of the Lăpuș
- Botiza, a river in Maramureș County, tributary of the Vaser
- Botiza (river), a river in Maramureș County, tributary of the Iza
