= Măgureni (disambiguation) =

Măgureni is a commune in Prahova County, Romania.

Măgureni may also refer to:

- Măgureni, a village in Mărașu Commune, Brăila County, Romania
- Măgureni, a village in Săruleşti Commune, Călăraşi County, Romania
- Măgureni, a village in Beriu Commune, Hunedoara County, Romania
- Măgureni, a village in Cernești Commune, Maramureș County, Romania
- Măgureni, a village in Gușoeni Commune, Vâlcea County, Romania
