= Dealu Mare =

Dealu Mare may refer to several villages in Romania:

- Dealu Mare, in Măgura Commune, Bacău County
- Dealu Mare, in the city of Dorohoi, Botoșani County
- Dealu Mare, in Râșca Commune, Cluj County
- Dealu Mare, in Buciumeni Commune, Dâmbovița County
- Dealu Mare, in Vălișoara Commune, Hunedoara County
- Dealu Mare, in Coroieni Commune, Maramureș County
- Dealu Mare, in the town of Baia de Aramă, Mehedinți County
- Dealu Mare, in Zorleni Commune, Vaslui County
- Dealu Mare, in Galicea Commune, Vâlcea County
- Dealu Mare, in Gușoeni Commune, Vâlcea County
- Dealu Mare, in Ionești Commune, Vâlcea County

== Other uses ==
- Dealu Mare wine region
