= Șatra =

- Location within Romania

Location
- Country: Romania
- Counties: Maramureș County
- Villages: Cupșeni

Physical characteristics
- Source: Mount Piciorul Șetrii
  - location: Lăpuș Mountains
  - coordinates: 47°34′25″N 23°51′49″E
  - elevation: 672 m (2,205 ft)
- Mouth: Rotunda
  - location: Libotin
  - coordinates: 47.5207°N 23.9565°E
  - elevation: 368 m (1,207 ft)
- Length: 13 km (8.1 mi)
- Basin size: 22 km^{2} (8.5 sq mi)

Basin features
- Progression: Rotunda→ Lăpuș→ Someș→ Tisza→ Danube→ Black Sea

The Șatra is a right tributary of the river Rotunda in Romania. It flows into the Rotunda near Libotin. Its length is 13 km (8.1 mi) and its basin size is 22 km^{2} (8.5 sq mi).
