= Chechiș =

Chechiș may refer to several places in Romania:

- Chechiș, a village in Dumbrăvița Commune, Maramureș County
- Chechiș, a village in Bălan Commune, Sălaj County
- Chechiș (river), a river in Maramureș County

and to:

- the Chechis, a Gurjar clan
