= Roia =

Roia or ROIA may refer to:

- Roia (Kiba), a character in the anime Kiba
- Roia (river), a river in Italy and France
- Radio One (company), an American broadcasting corporation
- Râoaia River, a river in Romania
- Restoration of Order in Ireland Act 1920
- Rural Oahu Interscholastic Association

== See also ==
- Roya (disambiguation)
