= Szilas =

Szilas is the Hungarian name for:

- Ulmoasa village, Tăuții-Măgherăuș town, Maramureș County, Romania
- Brestovec, Komárno District, Slovakia
