= Augustin Cupșa =

Romanian writer

- Born: 1980 (age 45–46)
- Occupation: Screenwriter

Augustin Cupșa (born 1980, in Craiova, Romania) is a Romanian writer and screenwriter. He initially obtained his diploma as a psychiatrist and practiced for some years in Bucharest and Paris. His first novel, Perforatorii, published in 2006, won him the Opera Prima prize awarded by the Writers Union of Romania at the National Union of Romanian Patronage Gala and the presence at Jeux de la Francophonie 2009, section Littérature, in Beirut, representing Romania.

== Work ==
In 2013, he was a writer in residence at International House of Authors in Graz, Austria.

His second novel, Așa să crească iarba pe noi, published in 2017, was shortlisted for PEN Prize Romania, for the Writers Union of Romania Prize Constantin Țoiu and was nominated for the European Union Prize for Literature 2019.

As a screenwriter he won the HBO Romania Prize for short script at Transilvania International Film Festival in 2006 and later on the European Alliance for Television and Culture bursary for screenwriting in Geneva. He collaborated with HBO to adapt the original series BeTipul in Romania (În derivă,2010–2012). He co-wrote Ceață (Fog, 2017) which won the Grand Prix at Festival Premiers Plans d`Angers, Sankt Petersburg Message to Man International Film Festival and the Special Mention of the Jury at Brussels International Film Festival. He also co-wrote Fructe necoapte (Unripe Fruit, 2018).

In 2020, he was selected for a writing residence in Tirana, Albania within Reading Balkans Residency. In 2021 a revised and completed edition of his short stories volume "Marile bucurii și marile tristeți” was released by Humanitas Publishing House

In 2022, he was awarded the BMEIA/Q21 writer residence in Museum Quartier, Vienna and the Hungarian Writers` Residence at Zsolnay Cultural Quarter in Pécs to develop his new literary project, a prose book on emigration and the imaginary of the foreigness. Eventually the long stories book Străinătate (Foreigness) was released at the end of 2022. Străinătate was nominated at the Romania Union of Writers Awards and it earned the Best Book Prize of the Association of Literary Editors, Printings and Literary

In 2023, his first book for children was released: 2 furnici și 1 elefant. De la un capăt al lumii la ceălalt (2 ants & 1 elephant. From one end of the world to another) a laugh-out-loud graphic novel which shortly became a best seller at Gaudeamus Book Fair. It was awarded the National Prize for Literature for children and youngsters by the Union of Writers in Romania, gaining also public acclaim.

== Biography ==
He is a descendant in a group of historic families coming from the North of Transylvania, bearing the name of Cupșa and tied to the commune of Cupșeni of which Samuil Cupșa, dean of Lăpuș 1870 - 1905, is his great-great-grandfather, Augustin S. Cupșa, priest and delegate for the Great National Assembly in Alba Iulia 1918 is his great-grandfather and Augustin V. Cupșa, medical doctor and writer, vice chancellor of the University of Medicine in Craiova (1998 -2015) is his father.

== Bibliography ==
Perforatorii (novel), Cartea Românească Publishing, 2006

Profesorul Bumb și macii suedezi (short stories), Cartea Românească Publishing, 2009

Marile bucurii și marile tristeți(short stories), Trei Publishing, 2013, Humanitas Publishing House, 2021

Velike radosti i velike tuge (Serbian translation of Marile bucurii și marile tristeți), Partizanska Knjiga, 2017

Așa să crească iarba pe noi (novel), Humanitas Publishing, 2017

Străinătate (prose), Humanitas Publishing, 2022

2 furnici si 1 elefant. De la un capăt al lumii la celălalt (children book), Humanitas Publishing House, 2023

Nouvelles de Roumanie, collection Miniatures (collective anthologies of short stories), Éditions Magellan & Cie, 2024 ISBN 978-2-35074-779-8

== Filmography ==
În Derivă, HBO Romania Productions and Factor Films, 2010, 2012

Ceață (Fog), Axel Films, 2017

Fructe necoapte (Unripe fruit), Libra Film Productions, 2019
