= Valea Poienilor River =

Valea Poienilor River may refer to:

- Valea Poienilor, a tributary of the Botiza in Maramureș County, Romania
- Valea Poienilor River (Siret), in Botoșani County, Romania
