= Borcut (Săsar) =

- Location within Romania

Location
- Country: Romania
- Counties: Maramureș County

Physical characteristics
- Mouth: Săsar
  - location: near Baia Mare
  - coordinates: 47.6507°N 23.5013°E
- Length: 10 km (6.2 mi)
- Basin size: 19 km^{2} (7.3 sq mi)

Basin features
- Progression: Săsar→ Lăpuș→ Someș→ Tisza→ Danube→ Black Sea

The Borcut (Hungarian: Borkút) is a right tributary of the river Săsar in Romania. It flows into the Săsar near the village Săsar, west of Baia Mare. Its length is 10 km (6.2 mi) and its basin size is 19 km^{2} (7.3 sq mi).
