= Firiza =

- Location within Romania

Location
- Country: Romania
- Counties: Maramureș County
- Villages: Blidari, Firiza, Baia Mare

Physical characteristics
- Source: Gutâi Mountains
- Mouth: Săsar
  - location: Baia Mare
  - coordinates: 47°39′52″N 23°36′12″E
  - elevation: 237 m (778 ft)
- Length: 28 km (17 mi)
- Basin size: 168 km^{2} (65 sq mi)

Basin features
- Progression: Săsar→ Lăpuș→ Someș→ Tisza→ Danube→ Black Sea

The Firiza (Hungarian: Fernezely) is a right tributary of the river Săsar in Maramureș County, Romania. It discharges into the Săsar in Baia Mare. Its length is 28 km (17 mi) and its basin size is 168 km^{2} (65 sq mi). The Strâmtori Dam is built on the river Firiza.

== Tributaries ==
The following rivers are tributaries to the river Firiza:

- Left: Șturu, Valea Neagră, Jidovaia
- Right: Valea Călămari, Pistruița, Valea Roșie, Valea Vălinile
