= Botiz (Lăpuș) =

- Location within Romania

Location
- Country: Romania
- Counties: Maramureș County
- Villages: Poiana Botizii

Physical characteristics
- Source: Mount Obcina Grindei
  - location: Lăpuș Mountains
- Mouth: Lăpuș
  - coordinates: 47°33′58″N 23°59′12″E
  - elevation: 470 m (1,540 ft)
- Length: 12 km (7.5 mi)
- Basin size: 31 km^{2} (12 sq mi)

Basin features
- Progression: Lăpuș→ Someș→ Tisza→ Danube→ Black Sea

The Botiz (Hungarian: Batizi-patak) is a left tributary of the river Lăpuș in Romania. It flows into the Lăpuș near Strâmbu-Băiuț. Its length is 12 km (7.5 mi) and its basin size is 31 km^{2} (12 sq mi).
