= Costeni =

Costeni may refer to several villages in Romania:

- Costeni, a village in the town of Tismana, Gorj County
- Costeni, a village in Cupșeni Commune, Maramureș County
- Costeni, a village in Măneciu Commune, Prahova County
