= Râoaia =

- Location within Romania

Location
- Country: Romania
- Counties: Maramureș County

Physical characteristics
- Source: Lăpuș Mountains
  - coordinates: 47°35′38″N 24°03′54″E
  - elevation: 615 m (2,018 ft)
- Mouth: Lăpuș
  - location: Lăpuș
  - coordinates: 47°30′18″N 24°00′52″E
  - elevation: 401 m (1,316 ft)
- Length: 15 km (9.3 mi)
- Basin size: 48 km^{2} (19 sq mi)

Basin features
- Progression: Lăpuș→ Someș→ Tisza→ Danube→ Black Sea

The Râoaia is a left tributary of the river Lăpuș in Maramureș County, Romania. It discharges into the Lăpuș in the town Lăpuș. Its length is 15 km (9.3 mi) and its basin size is 48 km^{2} (19 sq mi).

== Tributaries ==
The following rivers are tributaries to the river Râoaia:

- Left: Ciormotura
- Right: Zâmbrița
