= Colbu River =

Colbu River may refer to the following rivers in Romania:

- Colbu - tributary of the Băița
