= Chiuzbaia =

- Location within Romania

Location
- Country: Romania
- Counties: Maramureș County
- Villages: Chiuzbaia

Physical characteristics
- Source: Gutâi Mountains
- Mouth: Săsar
  - coordinates: 47°39′31″N 23°40′24″E
  - elevation: 316 m (1,037 ft)
- Length: 10 km (6.2 mi)
- Basin size: 20 km^{2} (7.7 sq mi)

Basin features
- Progression: Săsar→ Lăpuș→ Someș→ Tisza→ Danube→ Black Sea

The Chiuzbaia (Hungarian: Kisbánya) is a right tributary of the river Săsar in Romania. It flows into the Săsar in Baia Sprie. Its length is 10 km (6.2 mi) and its basin size is 20 km^{2} (7.7 sq mi).
