= Usturoi =

- Location within Romania

Location
- Country: Romania
- Counties: Maramureș County
- Cities: Baia Mare

Physical characteristics
- Mouth: Săsar
  - location: Baia Mare
  - coordinates: 47.6611°N 23.5772°E

Basin features
- Progression: Săsar→ Lăpuș→ Someș→ Tisza→ Danube→ Black Sea

The Usturoi is a right tributary of the river Săsar in Romania. It flows into the Săsar in the city Baia Mare. Its length is 6 km (3.7 mi) and its basin size is 12 km^{2} (4.6 sq mi).
