= Nagyhegy =

Nagyhegy is the Hungarian name for two villages in Romania:

- Măgureni village, Cernești Commune, Maramureș County
- Oraşu Nou-Vii village, Orașu Nou Commune, Satu Mare County
