= Băiuț =

Băiuț Erzsébetbánya
- Commune
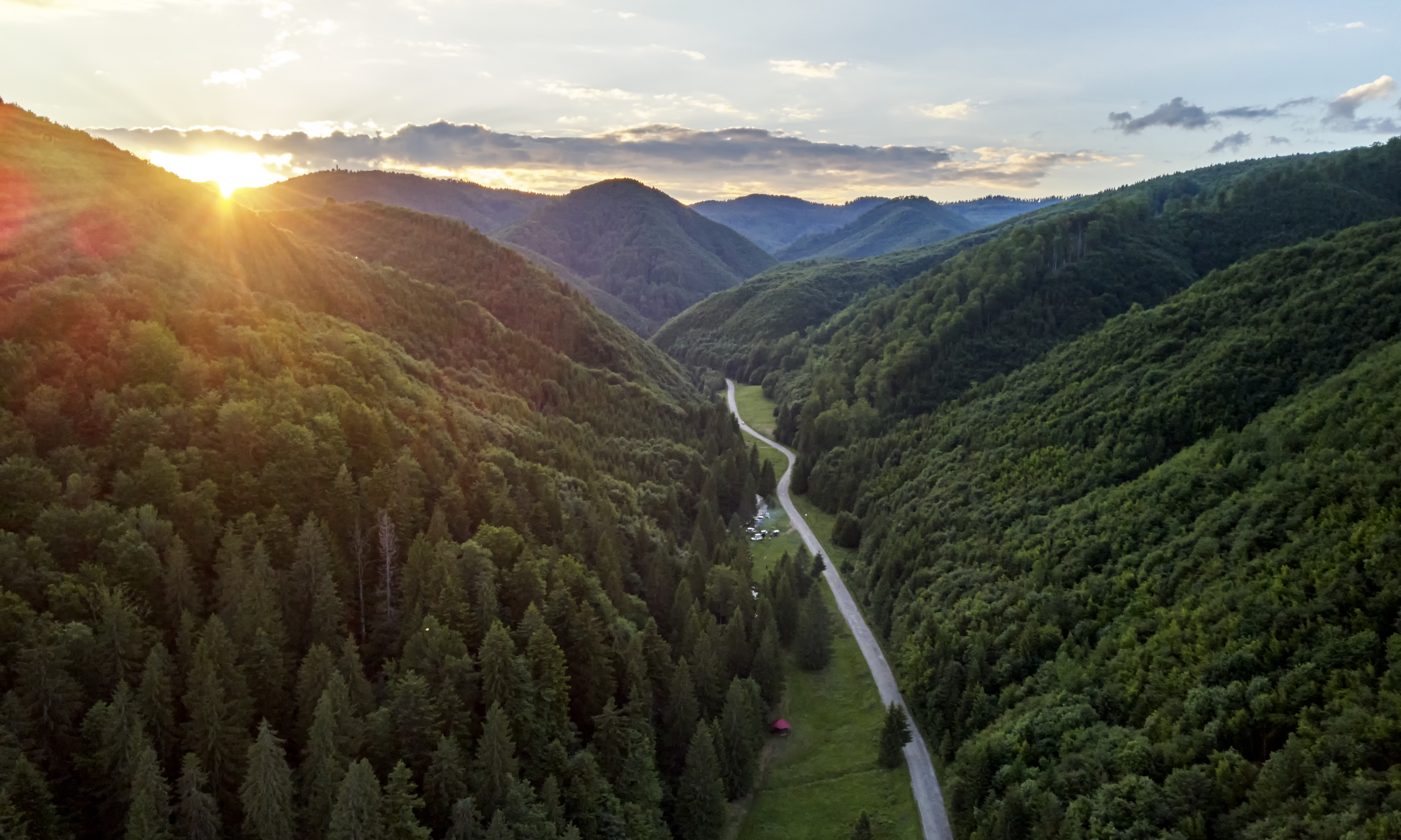
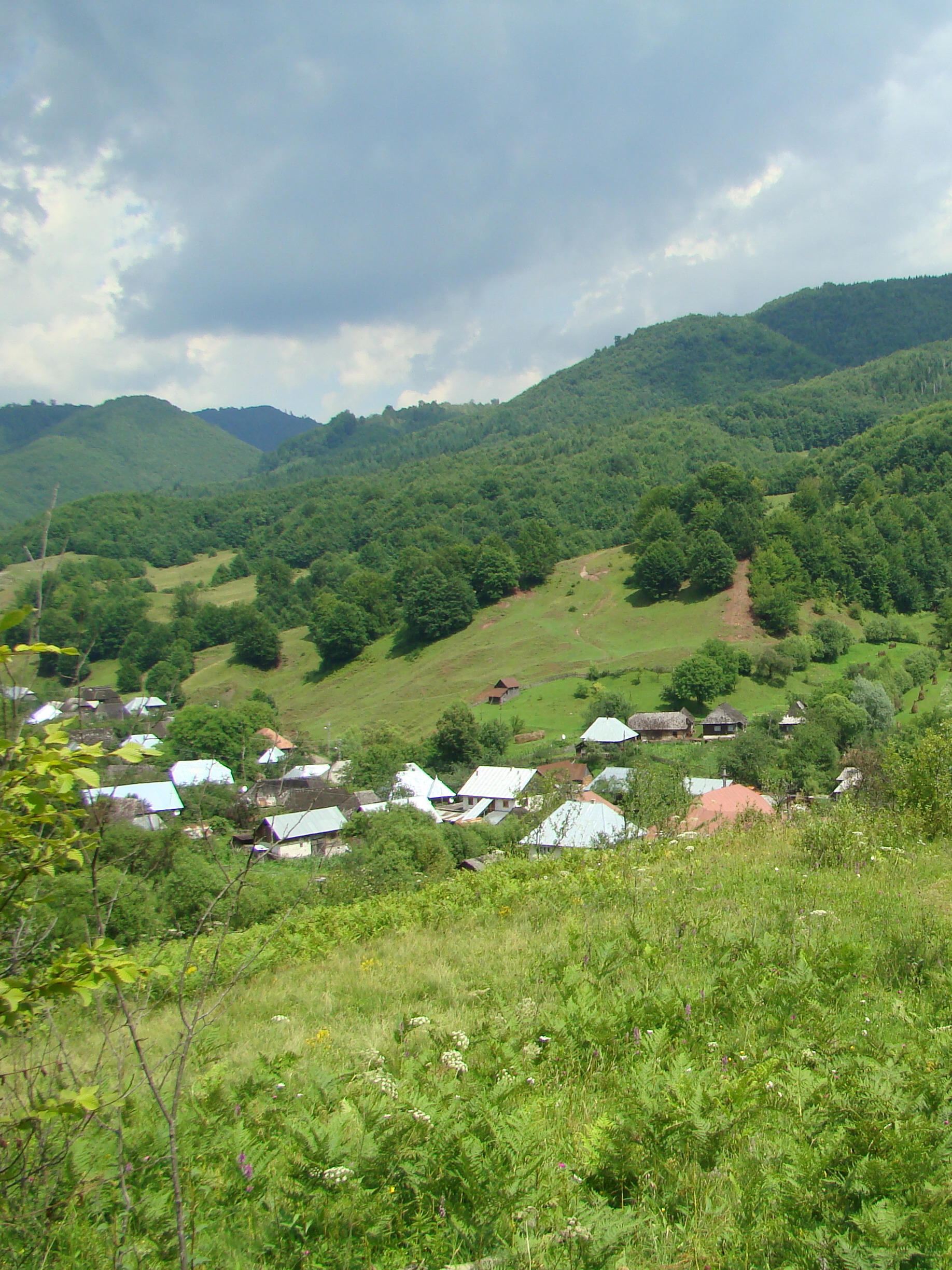
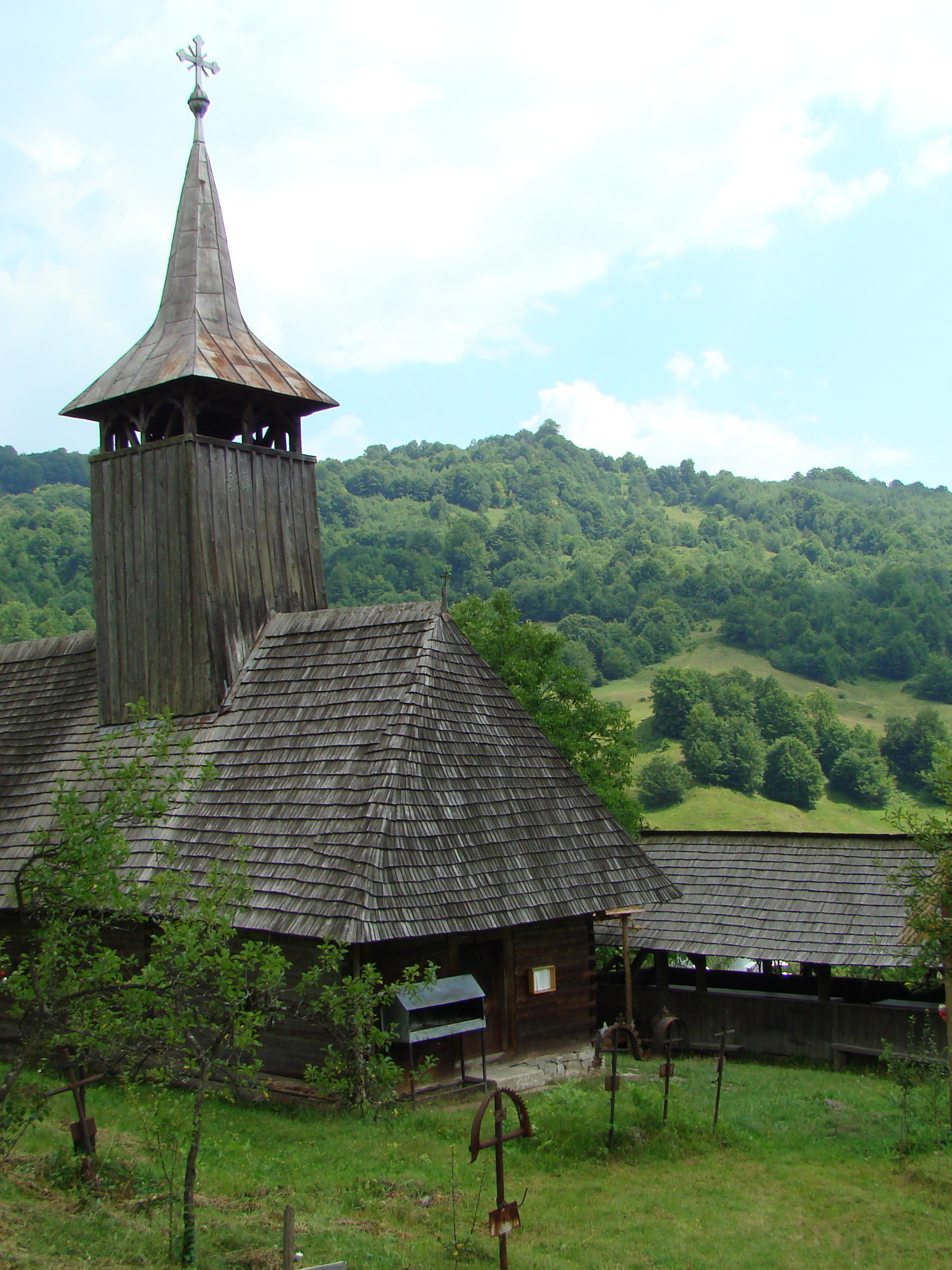
- From top, left to right: Strâmbului valley, Poiana Botizii village, Poiana Botizii wooden church

- Coat of arms

- Location in Maramureș County

- Location in Romania
- Coordinates: 47°36′50″N 23°59′45″E
- Country: Romania
- County: Maramureș

Government
  - Mayor (2024–2028): Krisztiana-Loredana Mureșan-Bertoti (PSD)
- Area: 113.60 km^{2} (43.86 sq mi)
- Elevation: 600 m (2,000 ft)
- Population (2021-12-01): 1,990
  - Density: 17.5/km^{2} (45.4/sq mi)
- Time zone: UTC+02:00 (EET)
  - Summer (DST): UTC+03:00 (EEST)
- Postal code: 437025
- Area code: (+40) 0262
- Vehicle reg.: MM
- Website: comunabaiut.ro

Băiuț (Hungarian: Erzsébetbánya) is a commune in Maramureș County, Transylvania, Romania. It is composed of three villages: Baiuț, Strâmbu-Băiuț (Kohóvölgy), and Poiana Botizii (Rákosfalva).

== History ==
Over the course of its history, the village of Băiuț has been known as Lápos-Bánya (1630), Bajutze (1850), and Oláh Lápos-Bánya or Băiuța (1854). The names all derive from the Băiuț Mine, an important landmark in the area. The settlement was also known as Erzsebetbanya, since it used to be the location of many properties of Elizabeth Szilágyi, wife of John Hunyadi and mother of Matthias Corvinus.

The first documented mention of the village was in 1630, while mining activities are known to have taken place here since 1315. However, skeletal remains of animals and traces of human activity in the Poiana Botizii cave dating back to the Upper Paleolithic, indicate the area was populated long before that.

The village Poiana Botizii was first documented as Botiz in 1344. In 1750, it was known as Pojana Zseler, in 1830 it was renamed to Batspojana, Batiz Polyan in 1835, and finally, in 1850, it became known by the Romanian name Poiana Botizii.

Strâmbu-Băiuț village was previously named Strambulu (1835), Strimbuy (1850), Sztrimbuly, Strâmbul Băiuțului, Horgospataka – Pârâul lui Horgos and Kohovolgy – Valea Furnalului (1854), names tied to the iron mine and forge there.

== Geography ==
Commune map

The commune is situated in the central part of the county, on the upper course of the Lăpuș River, 80 km (50 mi) southeast of the city of Baia Mare. It neighbors Budești commune to the north, Botiza commune to the east, Lăpuș commune to the south-east, Cupșeni commune to the south-west, as well as Cernești commune and the town of Cavnic to the west. The commune is at an altitude of 600 m (2,000 ft).

== Economy ==
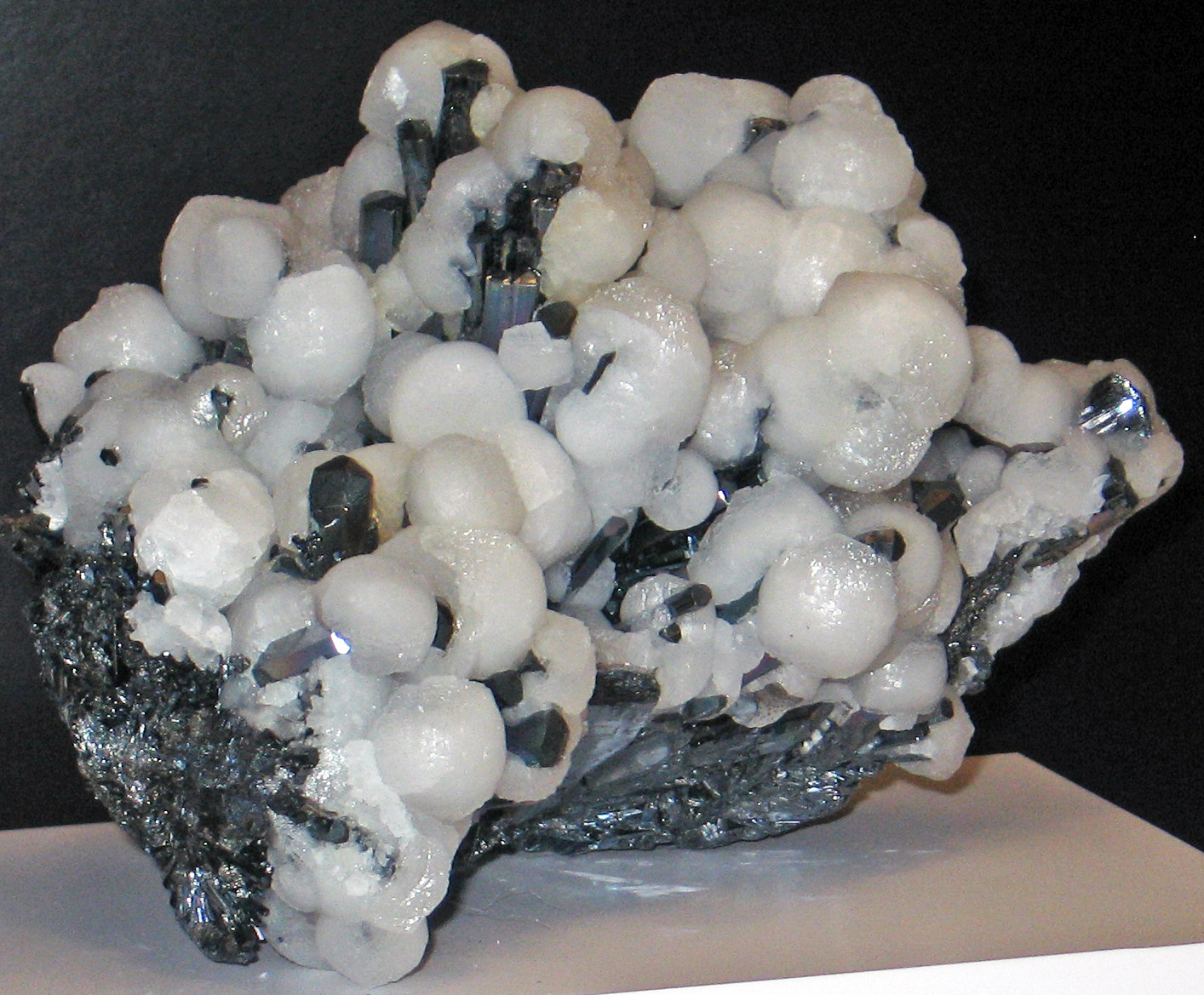
Stibnite-calcite from the Breiner Mine in Băiuț

=== Mining ===
Mining was the main economic activity in the area for much of its history. The gold here made the Băiuț mines an economically significant area in the Kingdom of Hungary. In the years after the Romanian Revolution, around 1,200 miners from Băiuț as well as nearby villages worked in the mines in the commune.

Around the year 2009, mining in Băiuț stopped. Economic life slowed down considerably, as employment fell.

On 27 March 2018, at around 3:30 am, a powerful noise followed by flooding with pit water from the shut-down Breiner Mine hit Băiuț. The acidic water, polluted by iron, manganese, and zinc, made its way into the nearby Lăpuș River. Authorities estimate the wildlife damage at one tonne of killed fish. Following the accident, the Maramureș County Prefect, Vasile Moldovan, requested that the company responsible for shutting down the commune's mines, Conversmin, pay for the repopulation of the river.

== Demographics ==
Historical population
Year	Pop.	±%
1880	2,437	—
1900	2,137	−12.3%
1910	2,184	+2.2%
1930	1,998	−8.5%
1956	2,810	+40.6%
1977	3,339	+18.8%
1992	3,100	−7.2%
2002	2,699	−12.9%
2011	2,340	−13.3%
2021	1,990	−15.0%
Source: Census data

=== Ethnicity ===

At the 2011 census, Băiuț had 2,340 inhabitants; of those, 64.8% were Romanians and 34.8% Hungarians. At the 2021 census, the commune had a population of 1,990.

== Administration and Politics ==
As a result of the 2020 Romanian local elections, Viorica Maciuc of the National Liberal Party was elected as mayor of Băiuț commune. At the 2024 elections, Krisztiana-Loredana Mureșan-Bertoti of the Social Democratic Party was elected mayor.

Mayors of Băiuț commune
Name	Party	Term
Krisztiana-Loredana Mureșan-Bertoti	PSD	2024–2028
Viorica Maciuc	PNL	2020–2024
Mihai Ceteraș	PSD	2016–2020
Mihai Ceteraș	PSD	2012–2016
Mihai Ceteraș	PC	2008–2012
Viorica Coc	PNL	2004–2008
Viorica Coc	PNL	2000–2004

Local Council of Băiuț commune (2020)
Party	Seats
National Liberal Party	3
Democratic Alliance of Hungarians in Romania	2
Coalition for Maramureș (Social Democratic Party-led coalition)	2
PRO Romania	1
Save Romania Union	1
Ecologist Party of Romania	1
People's Movement Party	1

== Natives ==
- Ioan Giurgiu Patachi (1680–1727), Bishop of Făgăraș and Primate of the Romanian Greek Catholic Church
- Mircea Roman (b. 1958), sculptor
- Adalbert Rozsnyai (b. 1952), footballer

== Sights ==
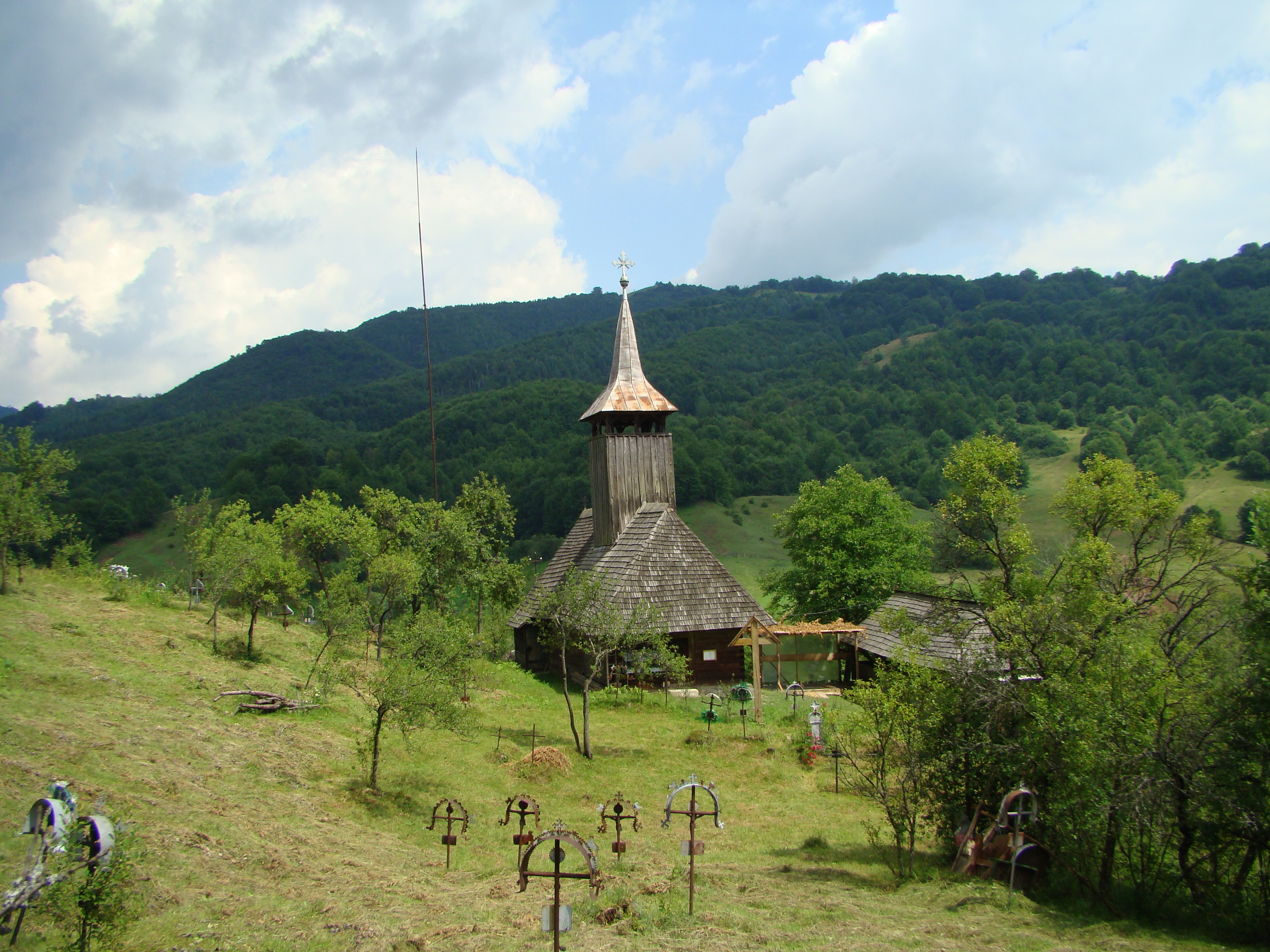
Wooden church in Poiana Botizii

- Wooden Church in Poiana Botizii, built in 1825, historic monument
- Black Pond Nature Reserve (1 ha (2.5 acres)), natural monument
- “Botiza Glade” Bone Cave Nature Reserve (0.5 ha (1.2 acres)), natural monument
