= Chechiș (river) =

- Location within Romania

Location
- Country: Romania
- Counties: Maramureș County
- Villages: Șindrești, Rus, Dumbrăvița,Dănești,Bontăieni

Physical characteristics
- Source: Țibleș Mountains
- Mouth: Lăpuș
  - location: Chechiș
  - coordinates: 47.5871°N 23.5787°E
- Length: 22 km (14 mi)
- Basin size: 101 km^{2} (39 sq mi)

Basin features
- Progression: Lăpuș→ Someș→ Tisza→ Danube→ Black Sea
- Tributaries
  - right: Șișești, Șindrești

The Chechiș is a right tributary of the river Lăpuș in Maramureș County, Romania. It flows into the Lăpuș near the village Chechiș. Its length is 22 km (14 mi) and its basin size is 101 km^{2} (39 sq mi).

== Tributaries ==
Șișești, Șindrești
