= Rotunda (Lăpuș) =

- Location within Romania

Location
- Country: Romania
- Counties: Maramureș County
- Villages: Ungureni, Libotin, Rogoz

Physical characteristics
- Mouth: Lăpuș
  - location: Rogoz
  - coordinates: 47°28′19″N 23°55′28″E
  - elevation: 345 m (1,132 ft)
- Length: 21 km (13 mi)
- Basin size: 72 km^{2} (28 sq mi)

Basin features
- Progression: Lăpuș→ Someș→ Tisza→ Danube→ Black Sea
- Tributaries
  - right: Șatra

The Rotunda (in its upper course also: Ungureni) is a right tributary of the river Lăpuș in Romania. It flows into the Lăpuș in Rogoz. Its length is 21 km (13 mi) and its basin size is 72 km^{2} (28 sq mi).
