= Săsar =

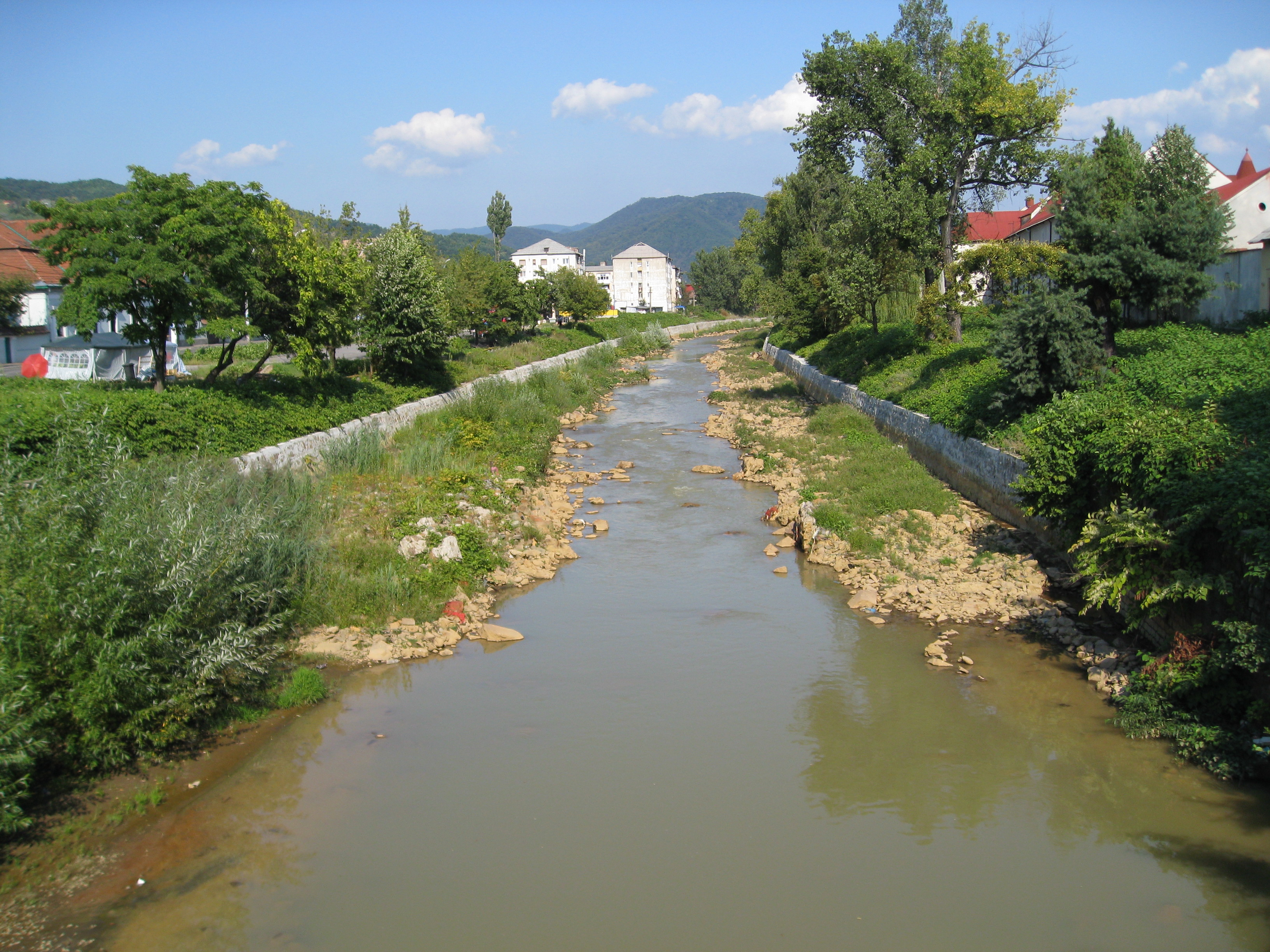
- The Săsar flowing through Baia Mare

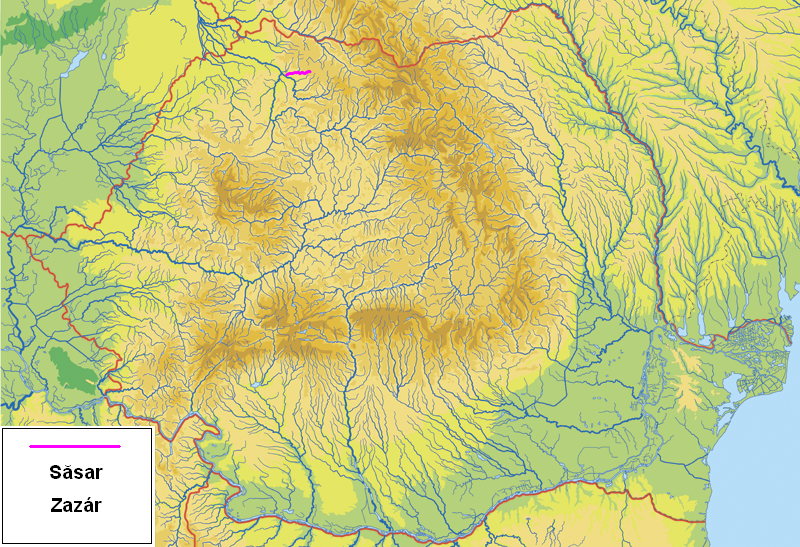

- Location within Romania

Location
- Country: Romania
- Counties: Maramureș County
- Villages: Baia Sprie, Tăuții de Sus, Baia Mare, Săsar

Physical characteristics
- Source: Mount Arșița
  - location: Gutâi Mountains
  - coordinates: 47°41′28″N 23°48′31″E
  - elevation: 1,005 m (3,297 ft)
- Mouth: Lăpuș
  - location: Bozânta Mare
  - coordinates: 47°37′24″N 23°27′33″E
  - elevation: 155 m (509 ft)
- Length: 31 km (19 mi)
- Basin size: 306 km^{2} (118 sq mi)

Basin features
- Progression: Lăpuș→ Someș→ Tisza→ Danube→ Black Sea
- Tributaries
  - right: Firiza

The Săsar (Hungarian: Zazar) is a right tributary of the river Lăpuș in Maramureș County, Romania. It discharges into the Lăpuș in Bozânta Mare, southwest of Baia Mare. It is a medium-size river which flows through the cities of Baia Sprie and Baia Mare. Its length is 31 km (19 mi) and its basin size is 306 km^{2} (118 sq mi).

== History ==
The river was heavily polluted with untreated sewage, agricultural fertilizer, and toxic chemicals from local mining sites, including cyanide, arsenic, lead, and cadmium. One notable incident occurred on 30 January 2000, when a tailings impoundment at the Baia Mare mine burst, releasing 50 to 100 tons of cyanide and heavy metals into the river. The Săsar, locally known as the "dead river," is unsuitable for bathing, washing, or fishing. The World Health Organization has identified the Baia Mare region as a "health risk hotspot."

The Săsar flows into the Lăpuș, which in turn flows into the Someș, a tributary of the Danube via the Tisza. Pollution in the Săsar thus eventually reaches other areas of Romania as well as Hungary, Serbia and Bulgaria.

However, following the closure of regional mining activities and heavy industrial metallurgical plants between 2008 and 2012, the primary sources of chemical dumping were removed. This marked the beginning of a gradual, long-term environmental recovery for the hydrographic basin, as toxic levels in the water column began to naturally decrease over the subsequent decade (Agerpres, 2026).

Throughout the 20th century, the Săsar River was subjected to intensive anthropogenic engineering to prevent seasonal flooding and facilitate industrial activities. These modifications included the constriction of the natural riverbanks, the construction of reinforced concrete retaining walls, and the installation of artificial sills through both Baia Sprie and Baia Mare (Primăria Municipiului Baia Mare, 2022). In recent years, these concrete structures have been integrated into sustainable urban development plans. Starting in 2022, local public projects co-funded by the European Union successfully rehabilitated the riverfronts, creating modern pedestrian walkways and public parks along the urban sections of the riverbanks (Graiul Maramureșului, 2022; Uniunea Arhitecților din România, 2025).

By 2026, the Săsar River started demonstrating biological resilience, gradually shedding its reputation as an ecologically dead channel (Maramureș Online, 2026). The improvement of water parameters has allowed local wildlife to spontaneously reclaim the river habitat. Today, communities of wild mallard ducks, egrets, and other aquatic birds are visible foraging along the river inside city boundaries (Agerpres, 2026). Furthermore, recent ecological monitoring has confirmed the return of various fish species to multiple sectors of the riverbed, indicating that the aquatic food chain is steadily recovering now that industrial pollution has ceased (Basilica News, 2026).

== Tributaries ==
The following rivers are tributaries to the river Săsar:

- Right: Chiuzbaia, Firiza, Usturoi, Borcut

=== References ===
- Agerpres. (2026, January 21). Maramureș: Habitatul natural al râului Săsar, afectat în trecut de poluarea minieră, se reface treptat; păsările sălbatice au revenit pe râu. Agenția Națională de Presă AGERPRES.
- Basilica News. (2026, January 22). Biodiversitatea urbană în refacere: Coloniile de rațe sălbatice și fauna acvatică repopulează cursul râului Săsar în Maramureș. Basilica.ro – Agenția de Știri a Patriarhiei Române.
- Graiul Maramureșului. (2022, March 23). Proiectul de amenajare a malurilor râului Săsar: Transformarea zonelor industriale degradate în coridoare verzi de promenadă. Graiul Maramureșului.
- Maramureș Online. (2026, February 15). Monitorizare ecologică: Semne clare de refacere a ecosistemului acvatic pe râul Săsar după sistarea deversărilor industriale. MaramuresOnline.ro.
- Primăria Municipiului Baia Mare. (2022). Hotărârea nr. 142/2022 privind aprobarea indicatorilor tehnico-economici pentru obiectivul de investiții „Amenajarea malurilor râului Săsar”. Monitorul Oficial Local.
- Uniunea Arhitecților din România. (2025). Revitalizarea urbană a culoarului albastru-verde al râului Săsar. Bienala Națională de Arhitectură, Secțiunea Spațiul Public și Comunitatea.
