= Săcălășeni =

- Commune
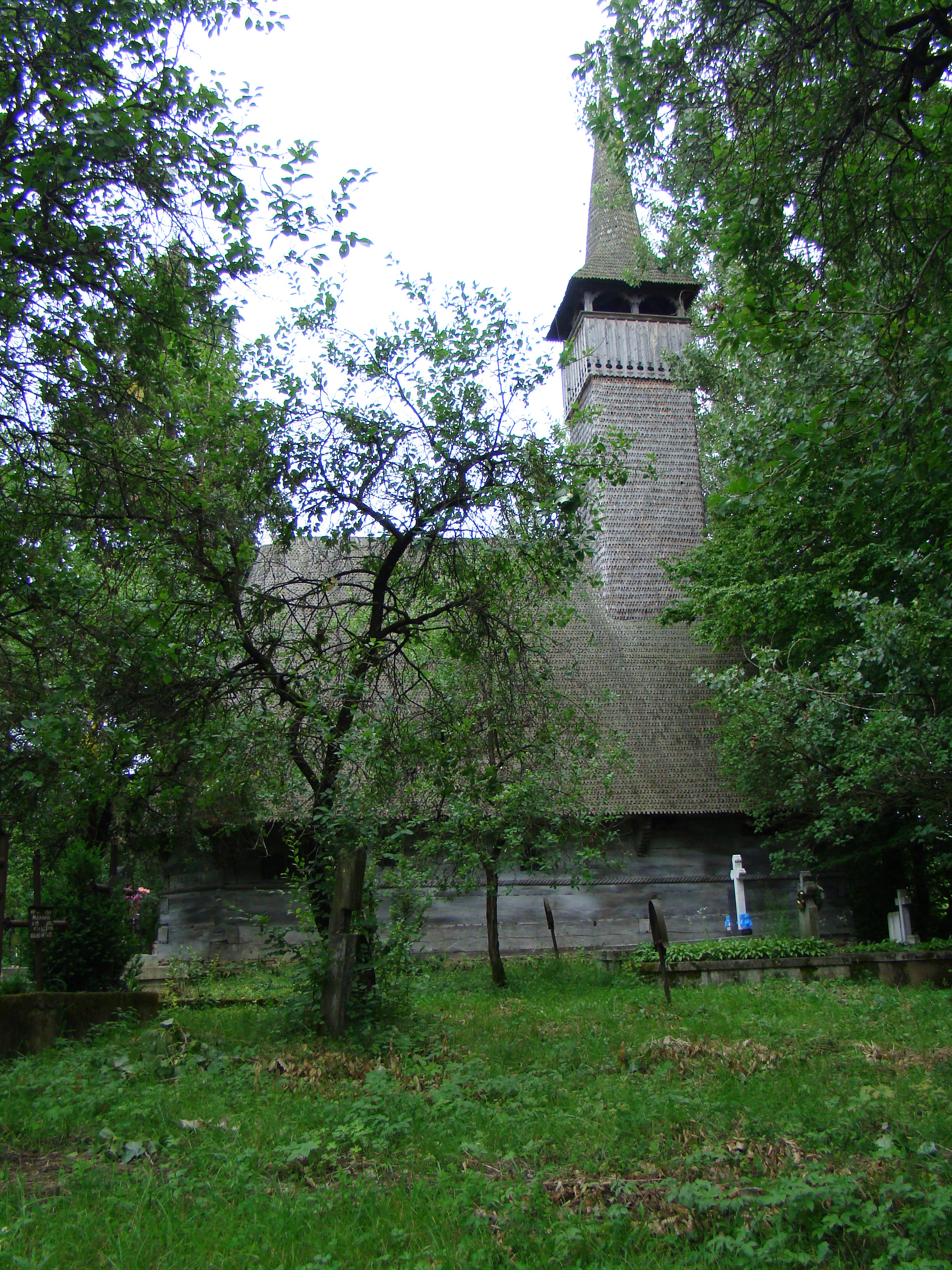
- Wooden church in Săcălășeni village

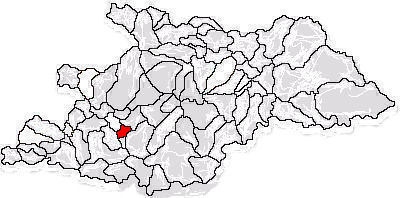
- Location in Maramureș County

- Location in Romania
- Coordinates: 47°35′N 23°34′E
- Country: Romania
- County: Maramureș

Government
  - Mayor (2020–2024): Emilian Gheorghe Pop (PSD)
- Area: 28.79 km^{2} (11.12 sq mi)
- Elevation: 170 m (560 ft)
- Population (2021-12-01): 2,438
  - Density: 84.68/km^{2} (219.3/sq mi)
- Time zone: UTC+02:00 (EET)
  - Summer (DST): UTC+03:00 (EEST)
- Postal code: 437280
- Area code: +(40) x59
- Vehicle reg.: MM
- Website: sacalaseni.ro

Săcălășeni (Hungarian: Szakállasfalva) is a commune in Maramureș County, Romania. It is made up of three villages: Coruia (Karuly), Culcea (Kővárkölcse), and Săcălășeni. From 1968 to 2004, it also included four other villages. These were then split off to recreate Coaș and Coltău Communes.

The commune belongs to the Baia Mare metropolitan area. It is located in the southwestern part of Maramureș County, 11 km (6.8 mi) south of the county seat, Baia Mare. The Lăpuș River flows through Săcălășeni.

Historical population
Year	Pop.	±%
1880	3,661	—
1900	4,194	+14.6%
1910	4,598	+9.6%
1930	4,775	+3.8%
1956	5,482	+14.8%
1977	6,055	+10.5%
1992	5,525	−8.8%
2002	5,819	+5.3%
2011	2,299	−60.5%
2021	2,438	+6.0%
Source: Census data

At the 2021 census, the commune had a population of 2,438; of those, 89.29% were Romanians and 3.53% Roma.
