= Craica =

- Location within Romania

Location
- Country: Romania
- Counties: Maramureș County
- Villages: Satu Nou de Sus, Baia Mare, Recea

Physical characteristics
- Mouth: Lăpuș
  - location: Lăpușel
  - coordinates: 47.6234°N 23.4860°E
- Length: 15 km (9.3 mi)
- Basin size: 15 km^{2} (5.8 sq mi)

Basin features
- Progression: Lăpuș→ Someș→ Tisza→ Danube→ Black Sea

The Craica is a right tributary of the river Lăpuș in Romania. It flows into the Lăpuș near Lăpușel. Its length is 15 km (9.3 mi) and its basin size is 15 km^{2} (5.8 sq mi).
