= Roya =

Roya may refer to:

- Roya (alga), a genus of green algae and a subgroup of Zygnemataceae
- Roya (river), a river of France and Italy
- Roya (gastropod), a synonym of Williamia, a genus of small sea snails
- Roya (given name), includes the list of notable people with the name
- Roya (singer), an Azerbaijani pop singer
- Roya, Princess Samira’s pet peacock in the American animated television series Shimmer and Shine
- Roya TV, a private Jordanian television station

== See also ==
- Roia (disambiguation)
- Royal (disambiguation)
