= Rohia =

- Location within Romania

Location
- Country: Romania
- Counties: Maramureș County
- Villages: Boiereni, Rohia

Physical characteristics
- Source: Țibleș Mountains
- Mouth: Lăpuș
  - location: Downstream of Târgu Lăpuș
  - coordinates: 47.4465°N 23.8346°E
- Length: 18 km (11 mi)
- Basin size: 71 km^{2} (27 sq mi)

Basin features
- Progression: Lăpuș→ Someș→ Tisza→ Danube→ Black Sea
- Tributaries
  - left: Valea Poienilor

The Rohia is a left tributary of the Lăpuș in Romania. It flows into the Lăpuș just west of Târgu Lăpuș. Its length is 18 km (11 mi) and its basin size is 71 km^{2} (27 sq mi).
