= Dobric (river) =

- Location within Romania

Location
- Country: Romania
- Counties: Maramureș County
- Villages: Dobricu Lăpușului

Physical characteristics
- Mouth: Lăpuș
  - location: near Târgu Lăpuș
  - coordinates: 47°27′14″N 23°49′06″E
  - elevation: 317 m (1,040 ft)
- Length: 20 km (12 mi)
- Basin size: 88 km^{2} (34 sq mi)

Basin features
- Progression: Lăpuș→ Someș→ Tisza→ Danube→ Black Sea
- Tributaries
  - right: Stoiceni, Teiul

The Dobric (Hungarian: Lápos-Debreki patak) is a right tributary of the river Lăpuș in Romania. It flows into the Lăpuș near Târgu Lăpuș. Its length is 20 km (12 mi) and its basin size is 88 km^{2} (34 sq mi).
