= Mircea Roman =

Romanian sculptor

Mircea Roman (born June 24, 1958) is a Romanian sculptor. Mircea's work has been offered at auction multiple times, with realized prices ranging from 200 USD to 5,435 USD, depending on the size and medium of the artwork.

Roman was born in Băiuț, Maramureș County in Romania.

== Prizes and titles ==
- 2017 Award of the Fine Artists Union of Romania for Sculpture
- 2008 Golden Medal of the Union of Fine Artists Union of the Republic of Moldova
- 2000 Order of the Faithful Service in the Degree of Officer
- 1993/1994 Delphine Studio London
- 1992 Grand Prize of Osaka Triennial
- 1988 Atelier 35 Bucharest Prize

== Works in public collections ==
Roman's work is represented in numerous museum and public collections including the Osaka Contemporary Art and Culture Center, National Museum of Contemporary Art Bucharest, National Museum of Art in Bucharest, Museum of Visual Arts Galați, The Museum of Recent Art, Bucharest, Craiova Art Museum.
