= Coroieni =

- Commune
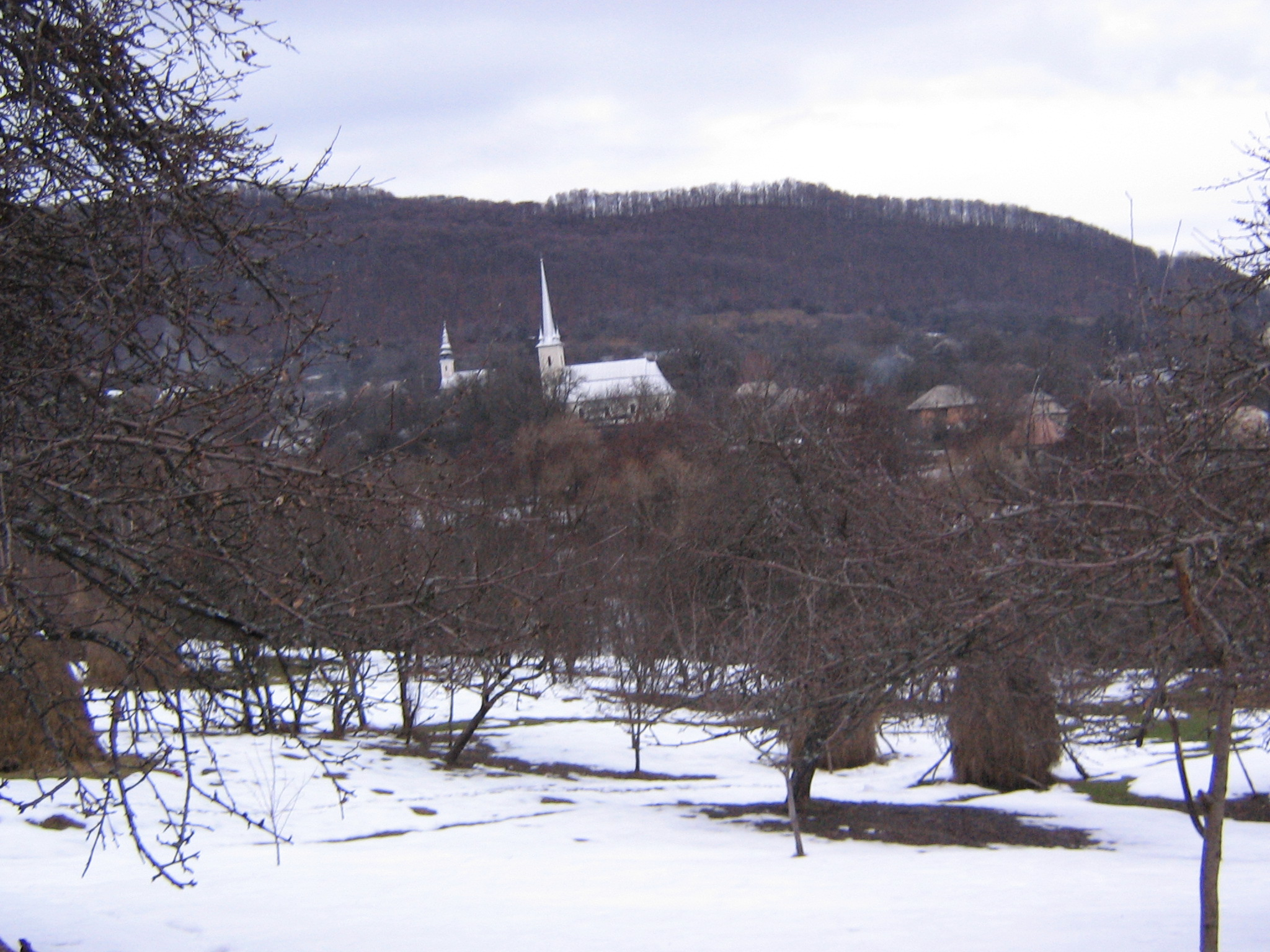
- Coroieni

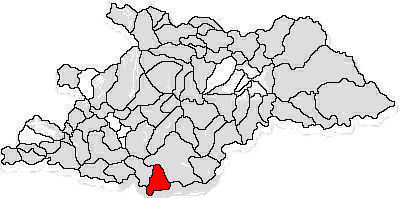
- Location in Maramureș County

- Location in Romania
- Coordinates: 47°22′N 23°46′E
- Country: Romania
- County: Maramureș

Government
  - Mayor (2020–2024): Gavril Ropan (PNL)
- Area: 66.93 km^{2} (25.84 sq mi)
- Elevation: 470 m (1,540 ft)
- Population (2021-12-01): 2,438
  - Density: 36.43/km^{2} (94.34/sq mi)
- Time zone: UTC+02:00 (EET)
  - Summer (DST): UTC+03:00 (EEST)
- Postal code: 437126
- Area code: +(40) x62
- Vehicle reg.: MM
- Website: comunacoroieni.ro

Coroieni (Hungarian: Karulyfalva) is a commune in Maramureș County, Transylvania, Romania. It is composed of five villages: Baba (Bába), Coroieni, Dealu Mare (Dombhát), Drăghia (Drágosfalva), and Vălenii Lăpușului (Dánpataka).

The commune is situated at the northwestern edge of the Transylvanian Plateau, in the foothills of the Lăpuș Mountains. It is located in the southern part of Maramureș County, within the historical Țara Lăpușului region. It lies 15 km (9.3 mi) southwest of Târgu Lăpuș and 48 km (30 mi) southeast of the county seat, Baia Mare, on the border with Sălaj County.

Historical population
Year	Pop.	±%
1880	2,582	—
1900	2,852	+10.5%
1910	2,949	+3.4%
1930	2,728	−7.5%
1956	2,782	+2.0%
1977	2,707	−2.7%
1992	2,389	−11.7%
2002	2,327	−2.6%
2011	2,219	−4.6%
2021	2,438	+9.9%
Source: Census data

At the 2021 census, Coroieni had a population of 2,438; of those, 63.7% were Romanians and 32.28% Roma.
