= Nistru (Someș) =

- Location within Romania

Location
- Country: Romania
- Counties: Maramureș County
- Villages: Nistru, Tăuții-Măgherăuș

Physical characteristics
- Source: Gutâi Mountains
- Mouth: Someș
  - coordinates: 47.6840°N 23.3877°E
- Length: 20 km (12 mi)
- Basin size: 43 km^{2} (17 sq mi)

Basin features
- Progression: Someș→ Tisza→ Danube→ Black Sea

The Nistru is a right tributary of the river Someș in Romania. It flows into the Someș near Cicârlău. Its length is 20 km (12 mi) and its basin size is 43 km^{2} (17 sq mi).
