= Vima Mică =

- Commune
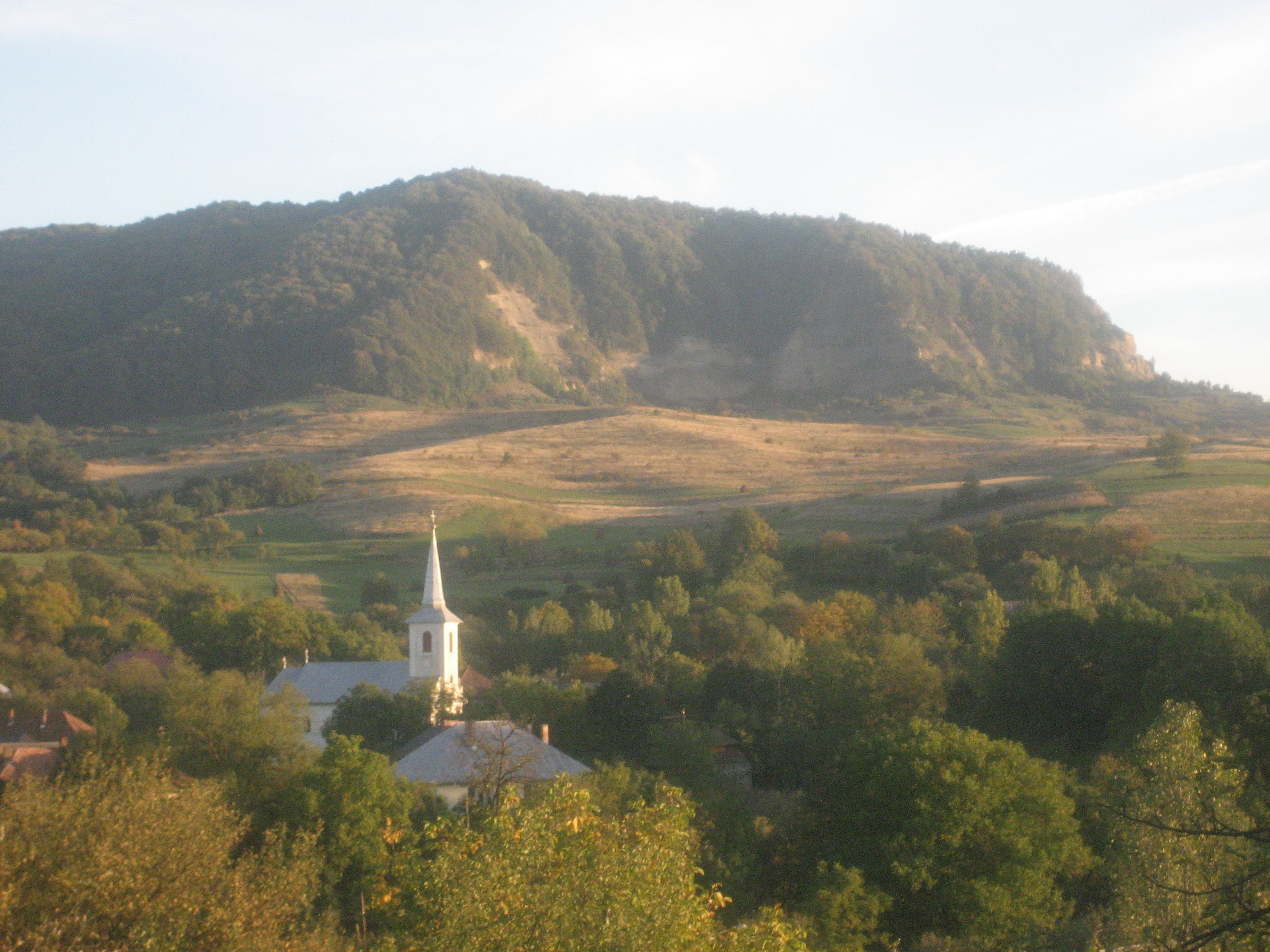

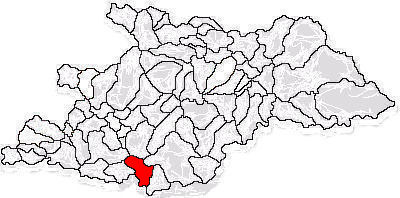
- Location in Maramureș County

- Location in Romania
- Coordinates: 47°24′N 23°43′E
- Country: Romania
- County: Maramureș

Government
  - Mayor (2024–2028): Liviu Balint (PSD)
- Area: 76.55 km^{2} (29.56 sq mi)
- Elevation: 354 m (1,161 ft)
- Population (2021-12-01): 1,239
  - Density: 16.19/km^{2} (41.92/sq mi)
- Time zone: UTC+02:00 (EET)
  - Summer (DST): UTC+03:00 (EEST)
- Postal code: 437380
- Area code: +40 x59
- Vehicle reg.: MM
- Website: comunavimamica.ro

Vima Mică (Hungarian: Drágavilma) is a commune in Maramureș County, Transylvania, Romania. It is composed of seven villages: Aspra, Dealu Corbului, Jugăstreni (Jávoros), Peteritea (Petőrét), Sălnița (Erdőszállás), Vima Mare (Tordavilma), and Vima Mică.

The commune is located in the southwestern part of the county, on the border with Sălaj County. It lies on the banks of the Lăpuș River, at a distance of 20 km (12 mi) from the town of Târgu Lăpuș and 68 km (42 mi) from the county seat, Baia Mare.

Historical population
Year	Pop.	±%
1880	2,846	—
1900	3,274	+15.0%
1910	3,426	+4.6%
1930	3,018	−11.9%
1956	2,847	−5.7%
1977	2,303	−19.1%
1992	1,857	−19.4%
2002	1,637	−11.8%
2011	1,448	−11.5%
2021	1,239	−14.4%
Source: Census data
