= Băița (Lăpuș) =

- Location within Romania

Location
- Country: Romania
- Counties: Maramureș County
- Villages: Băița, Tăuții-Măgherăuș

Physical characteristics
- Source
  - location: Gutâi Mountains
- Mouth: Lăpuș
  - location: Bușag
  - coordinates: 47.6478°N 23.4179°E
- Length: 22 km (14 mi)
- Basin size: 75 km^{2} (29 sq mi)

Basin features
- Progression: Lăpuș→ Someș→ Tisza→ Danube→ Black Sea
- Tributaries
  - right: Colbu, Limpedea

The Băița is a right tributary of the river Lăpuș in Romania. It discharges into the Lăpuș in Bușag. Its length is 22 km (14 mi) and its basin size is 75 km^{2} (29 sq mi).
