= Lăpuș =

- Commune
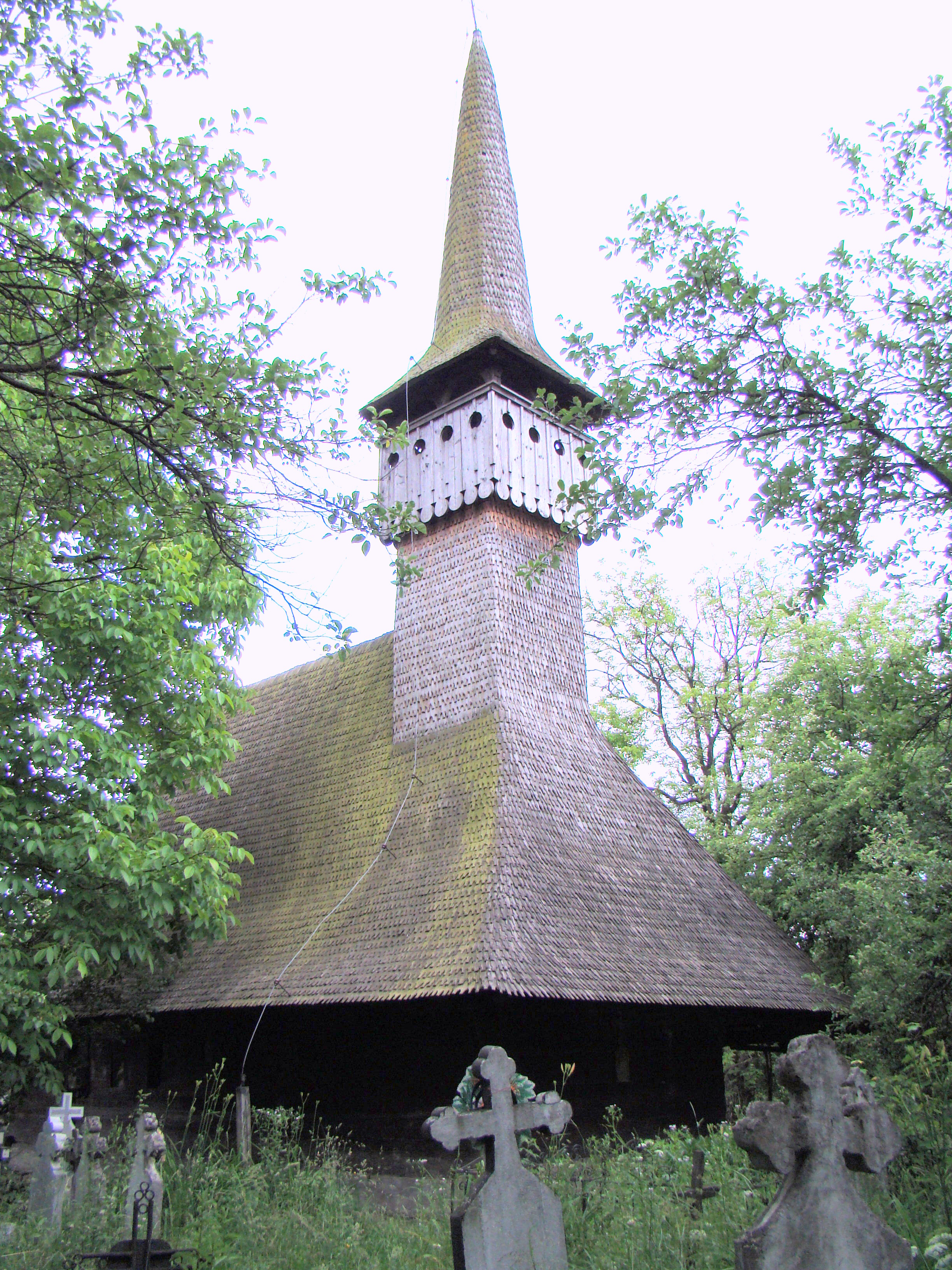
- Dormition of the Theotokos wooden church in Lăpuș

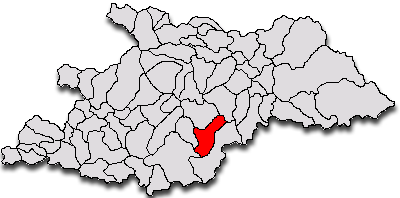
- Location in Maramureș County

- Location in Romania
- Coordinates: 47°29′44″N 24°0′25″E
- Country: Romania
- County: Maramureș

Government
  - Mayor (2020–2024): Cristina Buda (PNL)
- Area: 50 km^{2} (19 sq mi)
- Elevation: 393 m (1,289 ft)
- Population (2021-12-01): 3,278
  - Density: 66/km^{2} (170/sq mi)
- Time zone: UTC+02:00 (EET)
  - Summer (DST): UTC+03:00 (EEST)
- Postal code: 437175
- Area code: +40 262
- Vehicle reg.: MM
- Website: primaria-lapus.ro

Lăpuș (formerly Lăpușul Românesc; Hungarian: Oláhlápos) is a commune in Maramureș County, Transylvania, Romania. It is composed of a single village, Lăpuș.

== Geography ==
The commune is located in the southern part of the county, 13 km (8.1 mi) east of the town of Târgu Lăpuș, the center of the Țara Lăpușului ethnographic region. It is situated at an altitude of 393 m (1,289 ft), in a hilly area to the west of the Țibleș Mountains, on the banks of the Lăpuș River.

Lăpuș is crossed by county road DJ109F, which starts in Târgu Lăpuș and ends in Cavnic, about 32 km (20 mi) to the north. The county seat, Baia Mare, is 55 km (34 mi) to the northwest.

== History ==
Etymologically, its name appears to come from the Hungarian lápos (i.e., "flatland, bog, muddy place"), or from Proto-Slavic ло̀пӯх, a widespread name for burdock and other broad-leaf plants. Its existence is attested, under the name of Dragosfálva, in 1293, in an edict through which the land of Lápos is given by the King of Hungary to one Denis Tomaj, from the nation of the Patzinaks, although there are traces of habitation in the area as early as the Bronze Age (see Prehistory of Transylvania).

The village was a notable anti-communist resistance area after World War II (1949–1953).

Lăpuș has a beautiful old wooden church, built at the end of the 17th century, that was restored between 2002 and 2004.

== Demographics ==
Historical population
Year	Pop.	±%
1880	2,624	—
1900	2,796	+6.6%
1910	2,826	+1.1%
1930	3,016	+6.7%
1956	3,332	+10.5%
1977	3,919	+17.6%
1992	3,876	−1.1%
2002	3,828	−1.2%
2011	3,709	−3.1%
2021	3,278	−11.6%
Source: Census data

At the 2021 census, Lăpuș had a population of 3,278, with an absolute majority (95%) of ethnic Romanians.

== Natives ==
- Aristina Pop-Săileanu (1931 – 2019), anti-communist resistance leader in the Țibleș Mountains
