= Botiza (river) =

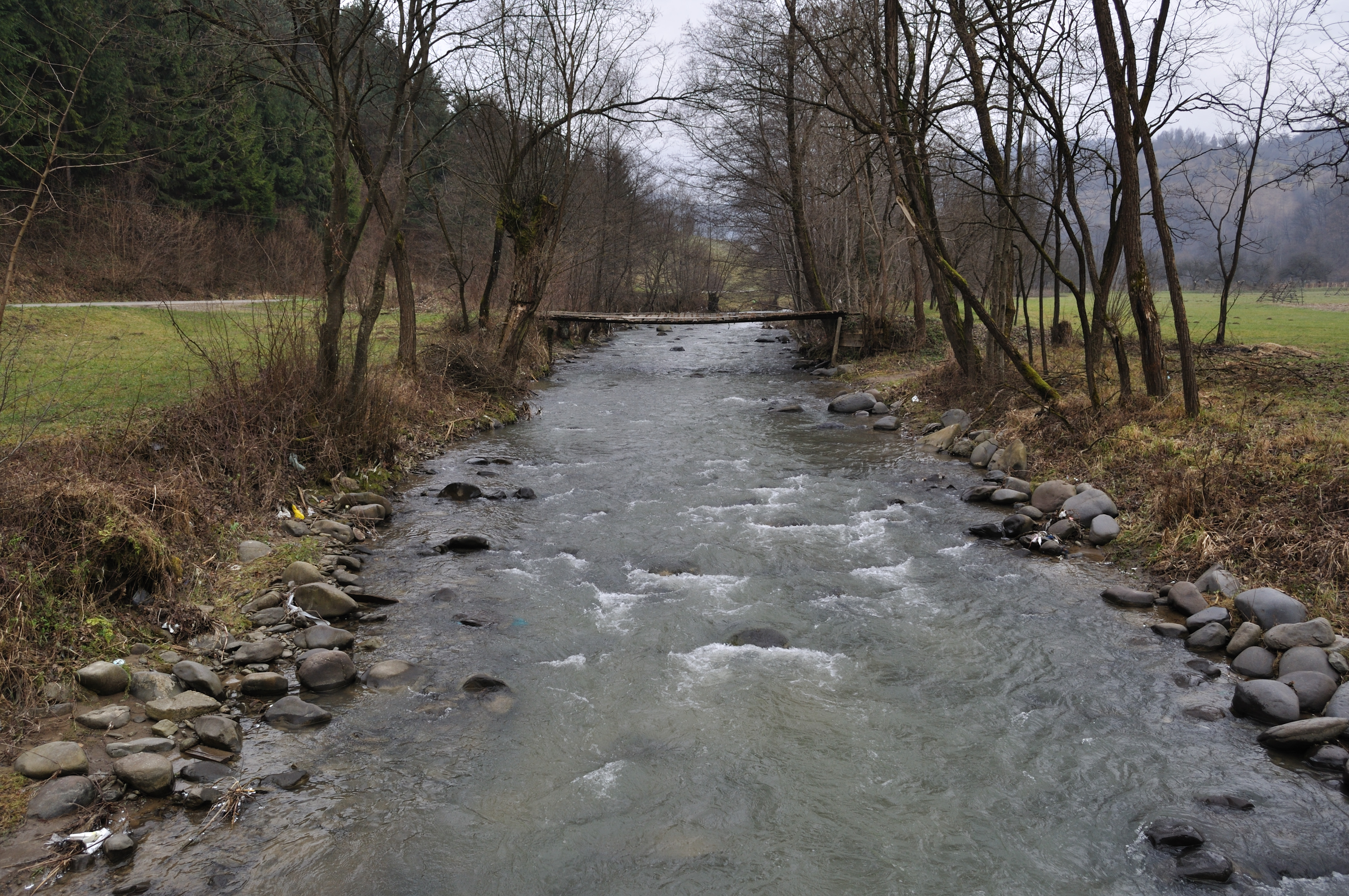
- Botiza river

- Location within Romania

Location
- Country: Romania
- Counties: Maramureș County

Physical characteristics
- Mouth: Iza
  - location: Șieu
  - coordinates: 47.7283°N 24.2272°E
- Length: 18 km (11 mi)
- Basin size: 102 km^{2} (39 sq mi)

Basin features
- Progression: Iza→ Tisza→ Danube→ Black Sea
- Tributaries
  - left: Secul, Sasu, Valea Poienilor

The Botiza is a left tributary of the river Iza in Romania. It discharges into the Iza in Șieu. Its length is 18 km (11 mi) and its basin size is 102 km^{2} (39 sq mi).
