= Gușoeni =

- Commune
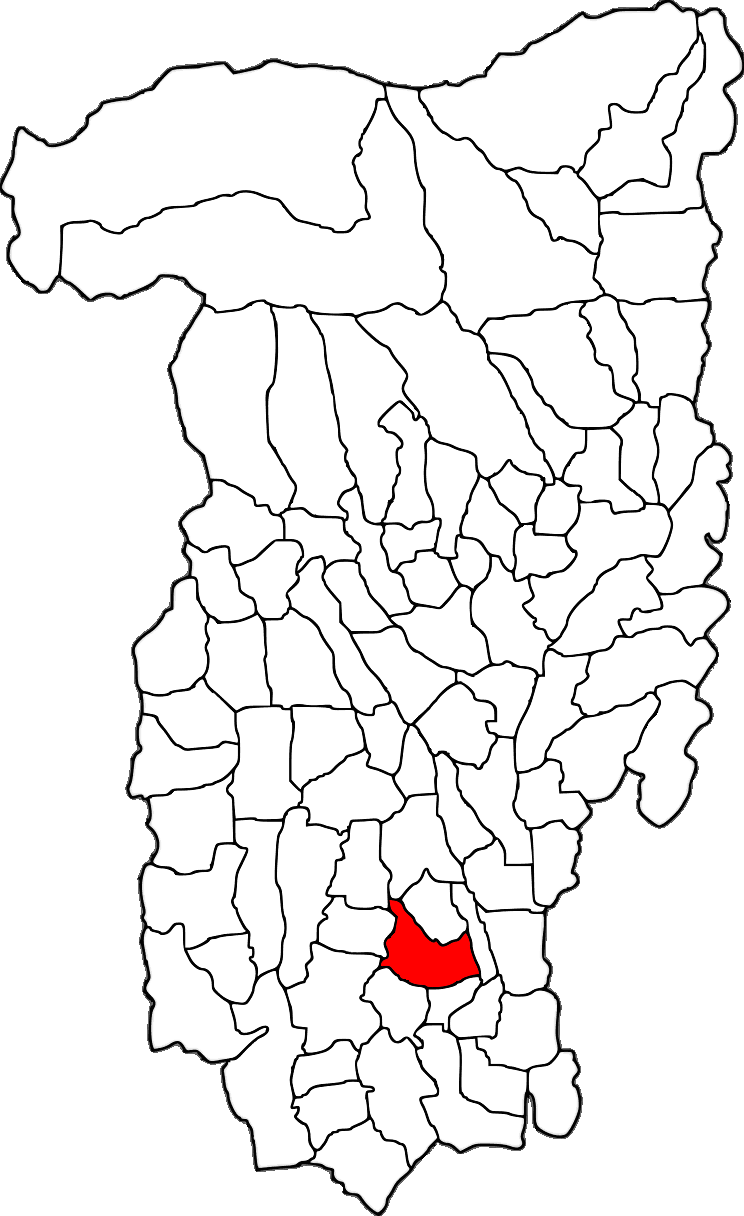
- Location in Vâlcea County

- Location in Romania
- Coordinates: 44°44′N 24°7′E
- Country: Romania
- County: Vâlcea
- Area: 32.14 km^{2} (12.41 sq mi)
- Population (2021-12-01): 1,161
  - Density: 36.12/km^{2} (93.56/sq mi)
- Time zone: UTC+02:00 (EET)
  - Summer (DST): UTC+03:00 (EEST)
- Vehicle reg.: VL

Gușoeni is a commune located in Vâlcea County, Oltenia, Romania. It is composed of six villages: Burdălești, Dealu Mare, Gușoeni, Gușoianca, Măgureni and Spârleni.
