= Coltău =

Coltău Koltó
- Commune
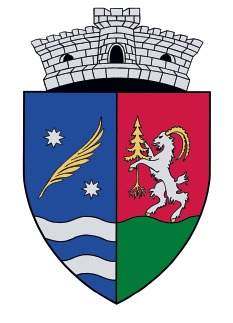
- Coat of arms

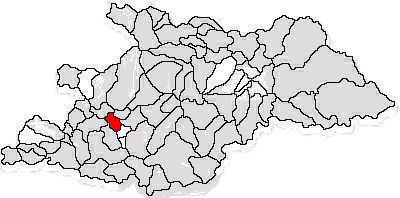
- Location in Maramureș County

- Location in Romania
- Coordinates: 47°36′N 23°31′E
- Country: Romania
- County: Maramureș

Government
  - Mayor (2024&nfdash;2028): Lajos Csendes (UDMR)
- Area: 12.95 km^{2} (5.00 sq mi)
- Elevation: 171 m (561 ft)
- Population (2021-12-01): 3,106
  - Density: 239.8/km^{2} (621.2/sq mi)
- Time zone: UTC+02:00 (EET)
  - Summer (DST): UTC+03:00 (EEST)
- Postal code: 437283
- Area code: (+40) 0262
- Vehicle reg.: MM
- Website: primaria-coltau.ro

Coltău (Hungarian: Koltó) is a commune in Maramureș County, Romania. It is composed of two villages, Cătălina (Koltókatalin) and Coltău. Formerly independent, the villages were part of Săcălășeni Commune from 1968 to 2004, when they were split off to form a separate commune.

Historical population
Year	Pop.	±%
1880	695	—
1900	930	+33.8%
1910	969	+4.2%
1930	1,066	+10.0%
1956	1,620	+52.0%
1977	1,739	+7.3%
1992	1,862	+7.1%
2002	2,148	+15.4%
2011	2,557	+19.0%
2021	3,106	+21.5%
Source: Census data

At the 2011 census, the commune had 2,557 inhabitants; of those, 57.1% were Hungarians, 37.8% Roma, and 5% Romanians. At the 2021 census, Coltău had a population of 3,106; of those, 40.37% were Hungarians, 40.15% Roma, and 13.23% Romanians.
