= Dumbrăvița, Maramureș =

Dumbrăvița
- Commune
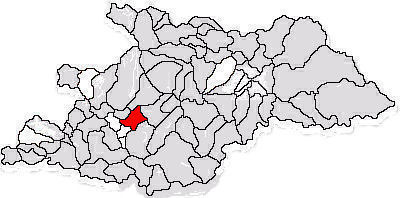
- Location in Maramureș County

- Location in Romania
- Coordinates: 47°36′N 23°39′E
- Country: Romania
- County: Maramureș

Government
  - Mayor (2024–2028): Felician Gheorghe Ciceu (PNL)
- Area: 51.67 km^{2} (19.95 sq mi)
- Elevation: 195 m (640 ft)
- Population (2021-12-01): 4,107
  - Density: 79.49/km^{2} (205.9/sq mi)
- Time zone: UTC+02:00 (EET)
  - Summer (DST): UTC+03:00 (EEST)
- Postal code: 437145
- Area code: (+40) 0262
- Vehicle reg.: MM
- Website: primariadumbravitamm.ro

Dumbrăvița (Hungarian: Szakállasdombó) is a commune in Maramureș County, Romania, 15 kilometres (9.3 mi) southeast of Baia Mare. It is composed of six villages: Cărbunari (Kővárfüred), Chechiș (Oláhkékes), Dumbrăvița, Rus (Kékesoroszfalu), Sindrești (Felsősándorfalu), and Unguraș (Magyarkékes).

Historical population
Year	Pop.	±%
1880	3,405	—
1900	3,956	+16.2%
1910	4,264	+7.8%
1930	4,422	+3.7%
1956	4,748	+7.4%
1977	5,099	+7.4%
1992	4,585	−10.1%
2002	4,499	−1.9%
2011	4,372	−2.8%
2021	4,107	−6.1%
Source: Census data
