= Cupșeni =

- Commune
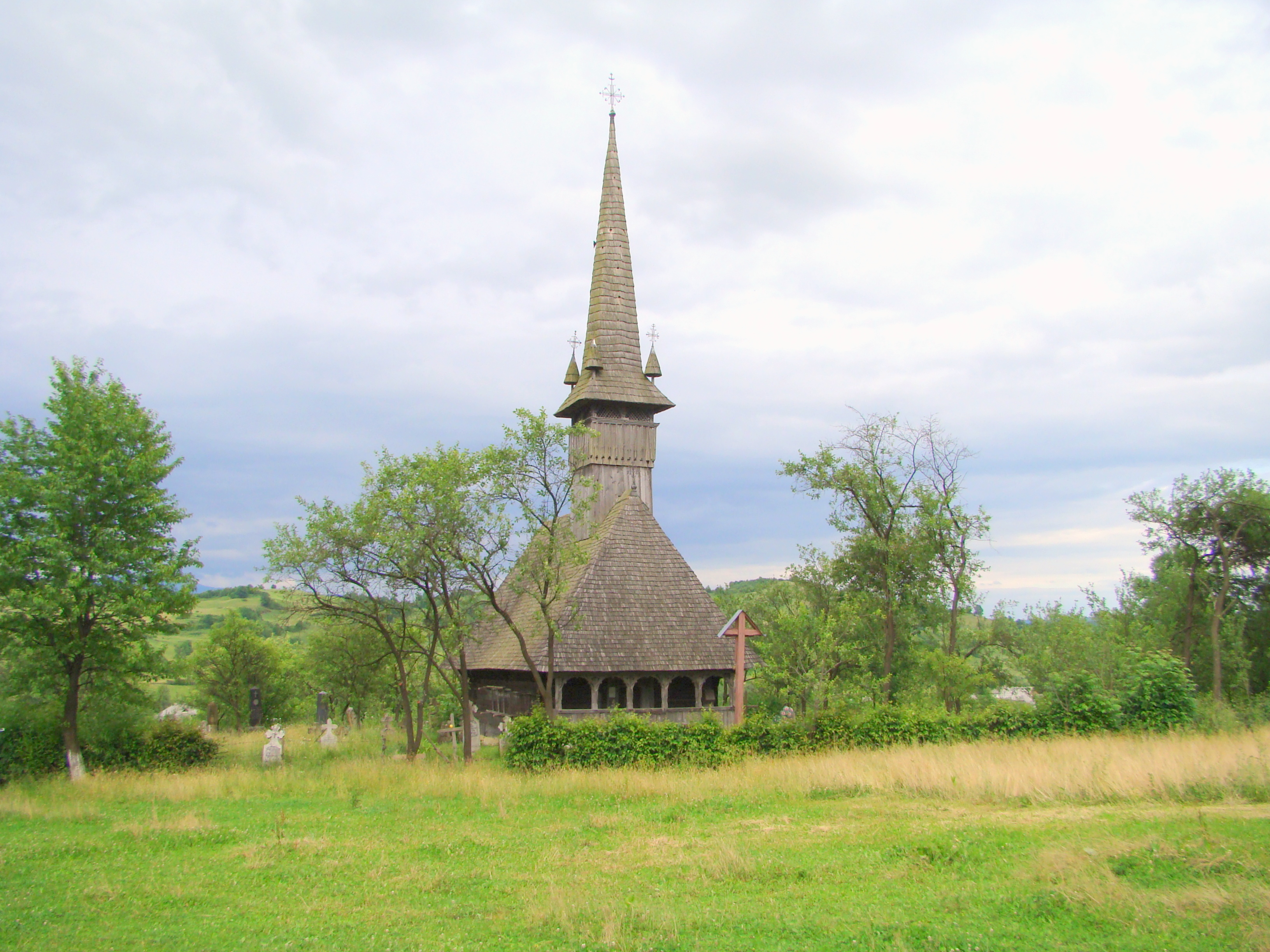
- Elijah the Profet's wooden church in Cupșeni

- Location in Maramureș County

- Location in Romania
- Coordinates: 47°33′N 23°56′E
- Country: Romania
- County: Maramureș

Government
  - Mayor (2020–2024): Lucia Butcure (PSD)
- Area: 89.56 km^{2} (34.58 sq mi)
- Population (2021-12-01): 3,205
  - Density: 35.79/km^{2} (92.69/sq mi)
- Time zone: UTC+02:00 (EET)
  - Summer (DST): UTC+03:00 (EEST)
- Postal code: 437130
- Area code: +40 x59
- Vehicle reg.: MM
- Website: www.primaria-cupseni.ro

Cupșeni (Hungarian: Kupsafalva) is a commune in Maramureș County, Transylvania, Romania. It is composed of four villages: Costeni (Kosztafalva), Cupșeni, Libotin (Libaton), and Ungureni (Nemesbudafalva).

The commune is situated in the Țara Lăpușului ethnographic region of southern Maramureș County, 18 km (11 mi) north of the center of that region, Târgu Lăpuș, and 61 km (38 mi) southeast of the county capital, Baia Mare. The river Rotunda and its tributary, Șatra, flow through Libotin.

Historical population
Year	Pop.	±%
1880	3,735	—
1900	4,296	+15.0%
1910	4,451	+3.6%
1930	4,422	−0.7%
1956	4,724	+6.8%
1977	4,707	−0.4%
1992	4,408	−6.4%
2002	3,778	−14.3%
2011	3,581	−5.2%
2021	3,205	−10.5%
Source: Census data
