= Coaș =

- Commune
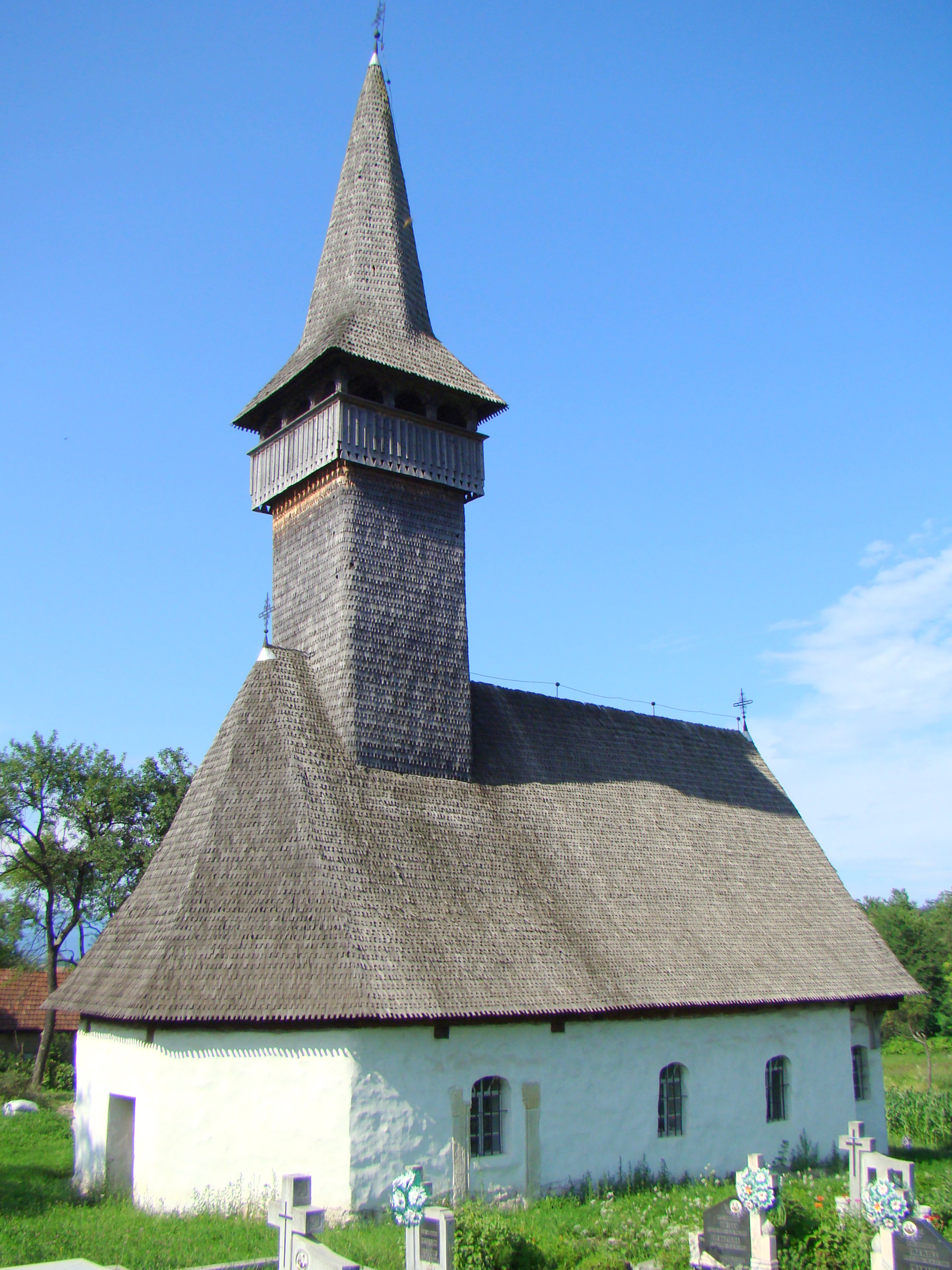
- Wooden Orthodox church (1730)

- Location in Maramureș County

- Location in Romania
- Coordinates: 47°32′N 23°35′E
- Country: Romania
- County: Maramureș

Government
  - Mayor (2024–2028): Călin Vasile Achim (PSD)
- Area: 26.56 km^{2} (10.25 sq mi)
- Elevation: 198 m (650 ft)
- Population (2021-12-01): 1,342
  - Density: 50.53/km^{2} (130.9/sq mi)
- Time zone: UTC+02:00 (EET)
  - Summer (DST): UTC+03:00 (EEST)
- Postal code: 437282
- Area code: (+40) 0262
- Vehicle reg.: MM
- Website: www.coas.ro

Coaș (Hungarian: Kovás) is a commune in Maramureș County, Romania. It is composed of two villages, Coaș and Întrerâuri (Láposköz). These were part of Săcălășeni Commune between 1968 and 2004, when they were split off to recreate a separate commune.

Historical population
Year	Pop.	±%
1880	1,042	—
1900	1,110	+6.5%
1910	1,195	+7.7%
1930	1,417	+18.6%
1956	1,645	+16.1%
1977	1,666	+1.3%
1992	1,488	−10.7%
2002	1,443	−3.0%
2011	1,402	−2.8%
2021	1,342	−4.3%
Source: Census data
