= Tăuții-Măgherăuș =

- Town
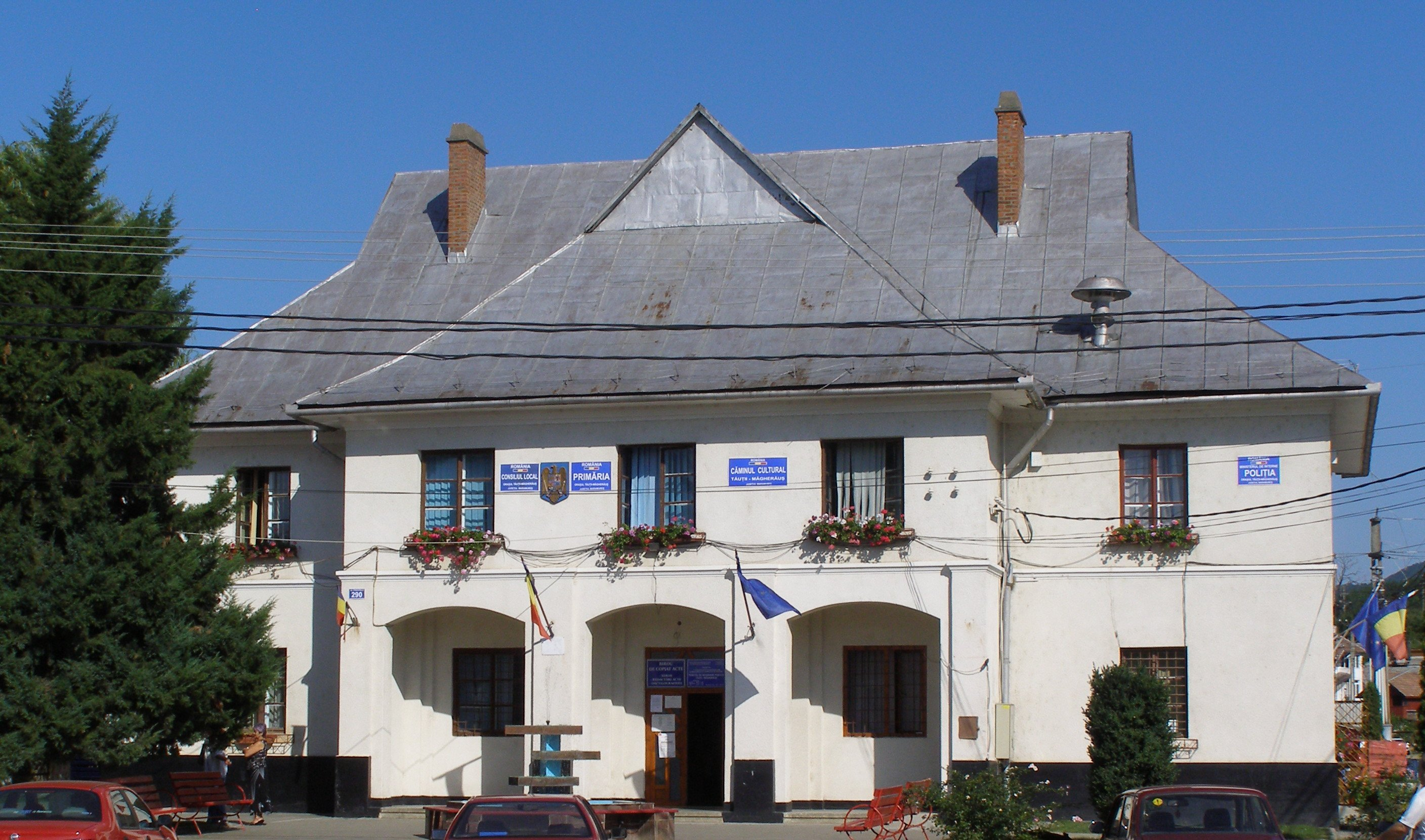
- Tăuții-Măgherăuș town hall

- Coat of arms

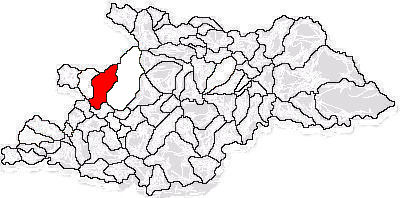
- Location in Maramureș County

- Location in Romania
- Country: Romania
- County: Maramureș

Government
  - Mayor (2024–2028): Dumitru Marinescu (PNL)
- Area: 125.64 km^{2} (48.51 sq mi)
- Elevation: 217 m (712 ft)
- Population (2021-12-01): 8,463
  - Density: 67.36/km^{2} (174.5/sq mi)
- Time zone: UTC+02:00 (EET)
  - Summer (DST): UTC+03:00 (EEST)
- Postal code: 437345
- Area code: (+40) 02 62
- Vehicle reg.: MM
- Website: tautiimagheraus.ro

Tăuții-Măgherăuș (Hungarian: Miszmogyorós) is a town in Maramureș County, Romania. The town administers six villages: Băița (Láposbánya), Bozânta Mare (Nagybozinta), Bușag (Buság), Merișor, Nistru (Miszbánya), and Ulmoasa (Szilas). Tăuții-Măgherăuș was declared a town in 2004. The Baia Mare Airport is located in the town.

== Geography ==
The town belongs to the Baia Mare metropolitan area. It is located in the western part of the Maramureș County, 10 km (6.2 mi) from the county seat, Baia Mare, on the border with Satu Mare County.

Tăuții-Măgherăuș lies on the right bank of the Someș River; the Lăpuș River discharges into the Someș in Bușag village. Other rivers that flow through the town are the Nistru and the Băița.

The town is crossed by national road DN1C (part of European route E58), which runs from Cluj-Napoca north towards Baia Mare and the border crossing at Halmeu, where it connects with the Ukrainian highway M26. The Bușag railway station serves the CFR Main Line 400, which connects Brașov with Baia Mare and Satu Mare.

== Demographics ==
Historical population
Year	Pop.	±%
1880	3,638	—
1900	4,148	+14.0%
1910	4,586	+10.6%
1930	4,585	−0.0%
1956	6,836	+49.1%
1977	7,547	+10.4%
1992	6,562	−13.1%
2002	6,713	+2.3%
2011	7,136	+6.3%
2021	8,463	+18.6%
Source: Census data

At the 2021 census, Tăuții-Măgherăuș had a population of 8,463, of which 76,39% were Romanians and 8.65% Hungarians. At the 2011 census, the town had 7,136, inhabitants, of which 82.55% were Romanians and 11.87% Hungarians. In 2002, it had 6,713 inhabitants, of which 84.3% were Romanians, 14.4% Hungarians, and 1% Roma; 78.3% were Romanian Orthodox, 12.1% Roman Catholic, 3.9% Greek-Catholic, and 3.5% Reformed.

== Natives ==
- Ion Șiugariu (1914 – 1945), poet
