= Copalnic-Mănăștur =

- Commune
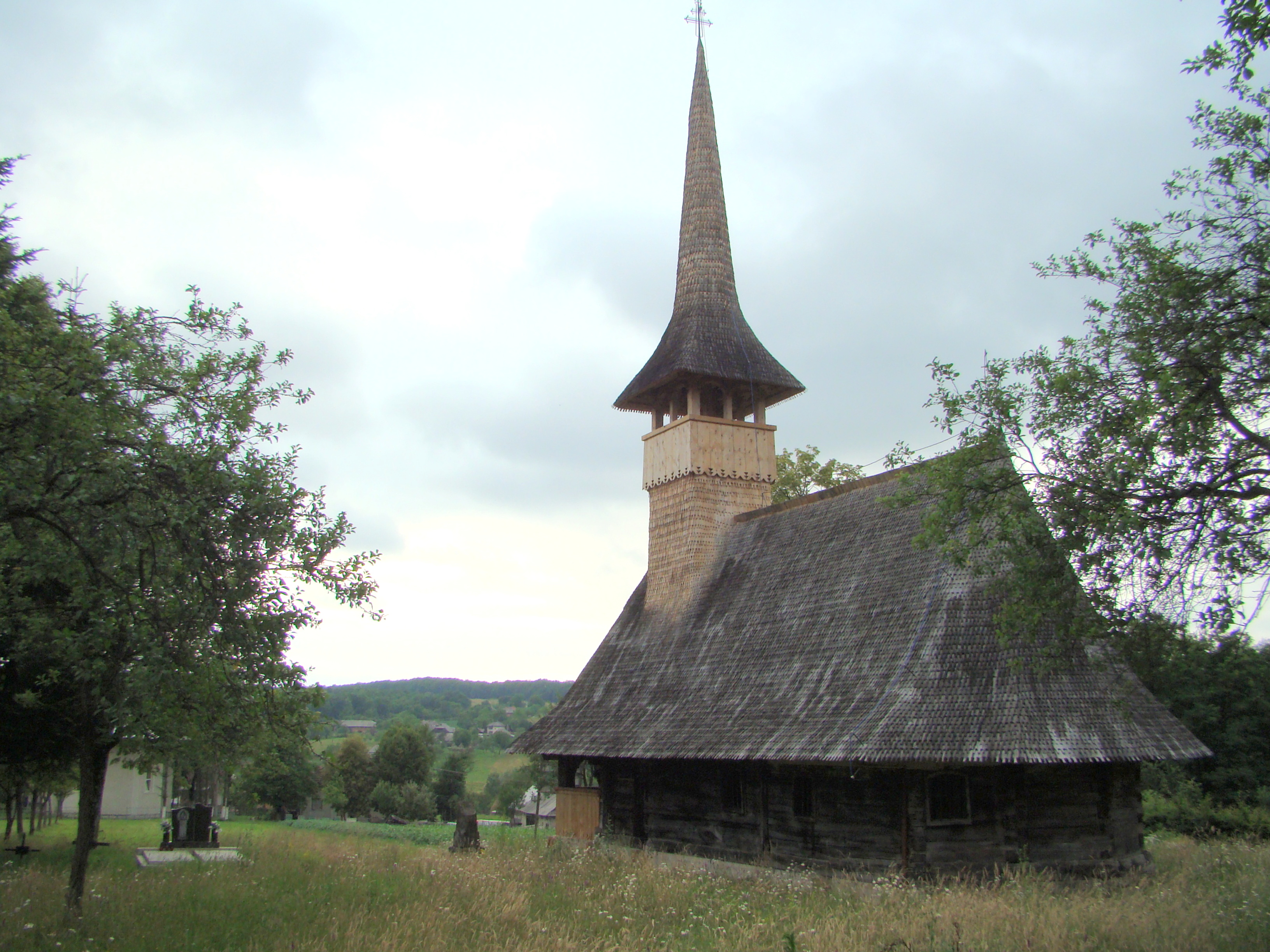
- Wooden church in Cărpiniș

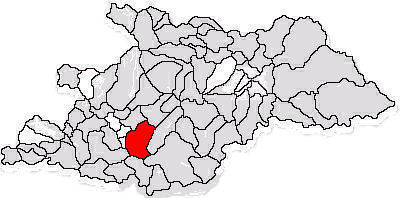
- Location in Maramureș County

- Location in Romania
- Coordinates: 47°30′21″N 23°40′47″E
- Country: Romania
- County: Maramureș

Government
  - Mayor (2020–2024): Vasile-Ștefan Mihalca (PNL)
- Area: 117.45 km^{2} (45.35 sq mi)
- Elevation: 243 m (797 ft)
- Population (2021-12-01): 5,242
  - Density: 44.63/km^{2} (115.6/sq mi)
- Time zone: UTC+02:00 (EET)
  - Summer (DST): UTC+03:00 (EEST)
- Postal code: 437100
- Area code: +40 x59
- Vehicle reg.: MM
- Website: primariacopalnicmanastur.ro

Copalnic-Mănăștur (Hungarian: Kápolnokmonostor) is a commune in Maramureș County, Transylvania, Romania. It is composed of twelve villages: Berința (Kővárberence), Cărpiniș (Kővárgyertyános), Copalnic (Szurdukkápolnok), Copalnic-Deal (Kápolnokdomb), Copalnic-Mănăștur, Curtuiușu Mic (Kiskörtvélyes), Făurești (Kováskápolnok), Lăschia (Lacház), Preluca Nouă (Újharagos), Preluca Veche (Haragos), Rușor (Rózsapatak), and Vad (Révkápolnok). The general area is a historic mining region.

Historical population
Year	Pop.	±%
1880	6,293	—
1900	7,301	+16.0%
1910	7,595	+4.0%
1930	7,063	−7.0%
1956	6,745	−4.5%
1977	6,629	−1.7%
1992	6,070	−8.4%
2002	5,838	−3.8%
2011	5,673	−2.8%
2021	5,242	−7.6%
Source: Census data

== Natives ==
- Augustin Buzura (1938 – 2017), novelist and short story writer
