= Lăpuș (river) =

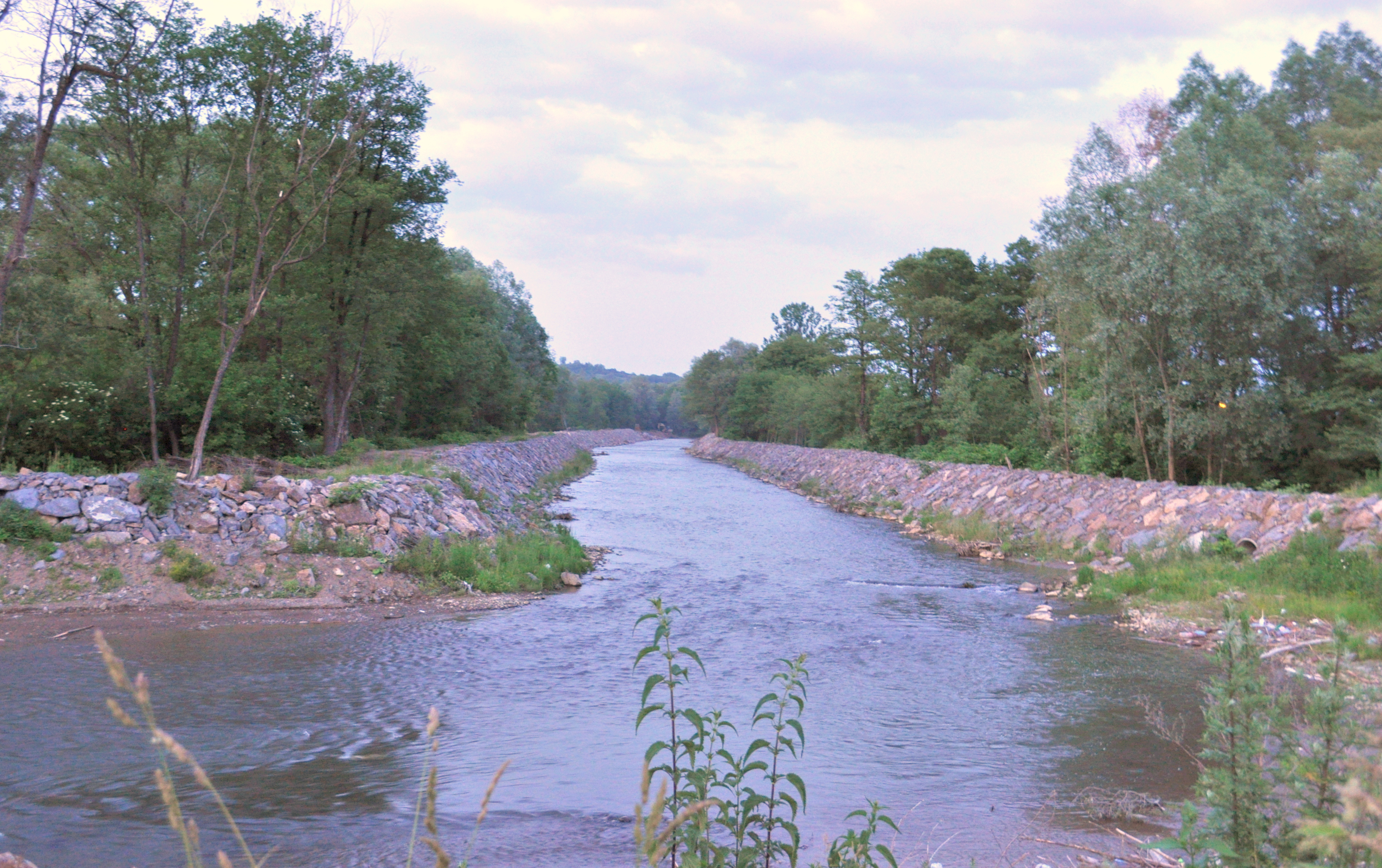
- The Lăpuș at Preluca Nouă

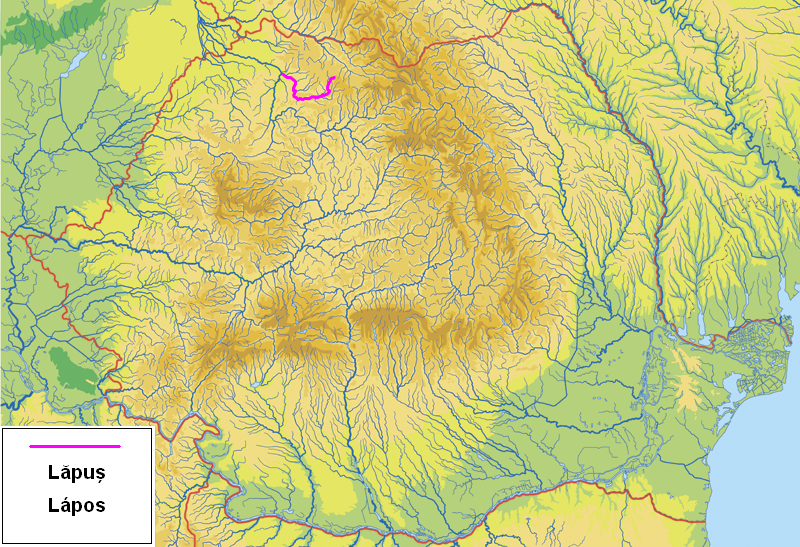

Location
- Country: Romania
- Counties: Maramureș County
- Towns: Târgu Lăpuș, Șomcuta Mare

Physical characteristics
- Source: Lăpuș Mountains
- Mouth: Someș
  - coordinates: 47°39′22″N 23°24′05″E
  - elevation: 143 m (469 ft)
- Length: 119 km (74 mi)
- Basin size: 1,875 km^{2} (724 sq mi)

Basin features
- Progression: Someș→ Tisza→ Danube→ Black Sea
- Tributaries
  - left: Suciu
  - right: Cavnic, Săsar

The Lăpuș (Hungarian: Lápos) is a right tributary of the river Someș in Romania. It originates in the Lăpuș Mountains, Maramureș County. It discharges into the Someș in Bușag, west of Baia Mare. It flows through the communes Băiuț, Lăpuș, Târgu Lăpuș, Vima Mică, Șomcuta Mare, Remetea Chioarului, Coaș, Săcălășeni, Groși, Coltău, Recea and Tăuții-Măgherăuș. Its length is 119 km (74 mi) and its basin size is 1,875 km^{2} (724 sq mi).

== Tributaries ==
The following rivers are tributaries to the river Lăpuș (from source to mouth):

- Left: Tocila, Botiz, Râoaia, Iedera, Suciu, Nireș, Rohia, Valea Mare, Valea Gâdelui, Boiul, Prislop
- Right: Strâmbul Băiuț, Rotunda, Dobric, Valea Rea, Cavnic, Chechiș, Craica, Săsar, Băița
