= Cernești =

- Commune
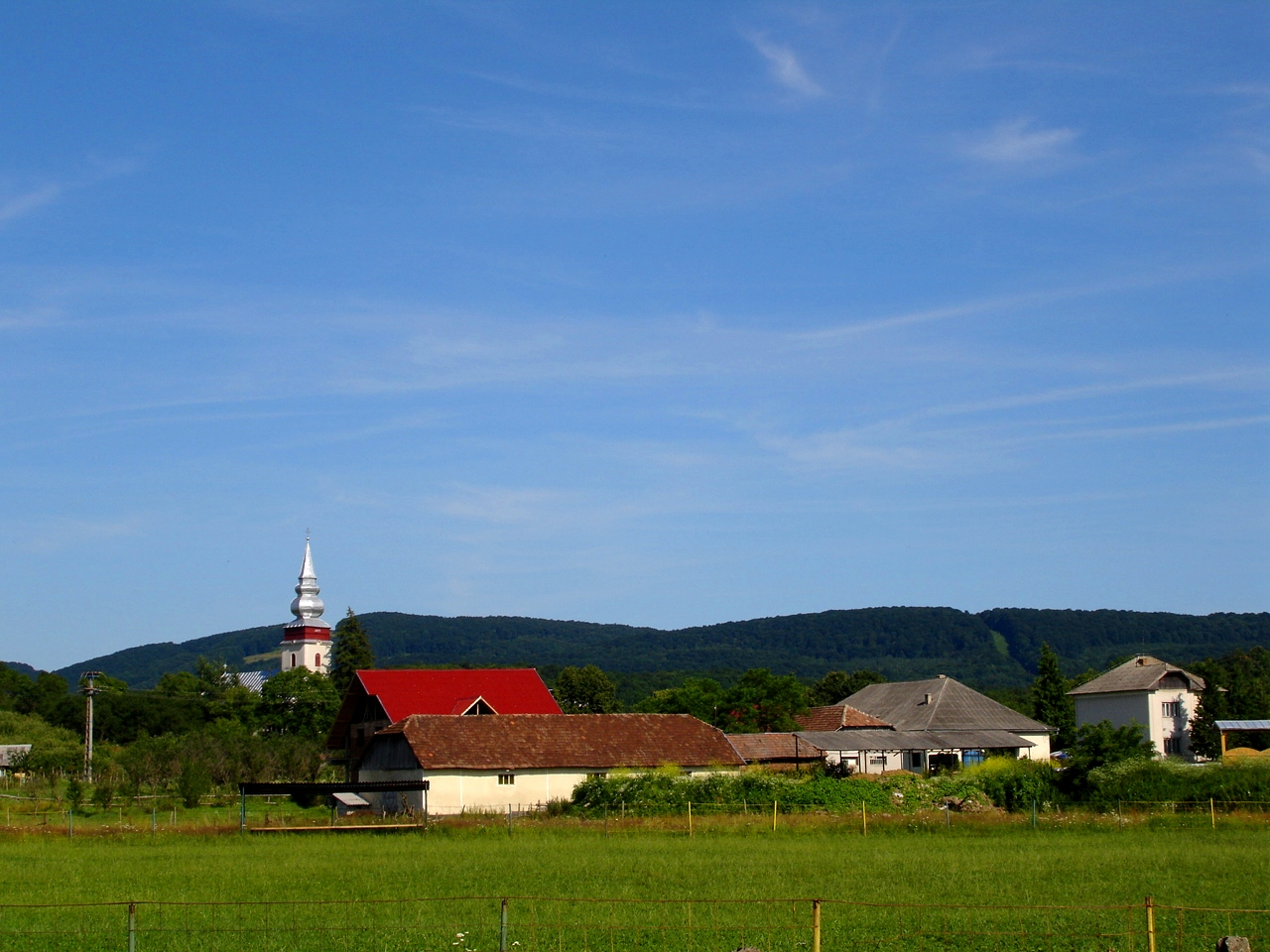
- Cernești village

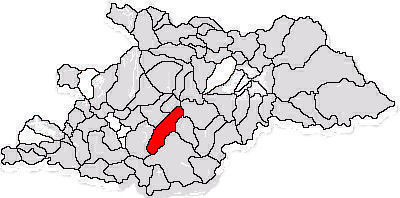
- Location in Maramureș County

- Location in Romania
- Coordinates: 47°31′N 23°45′E
- Country: Romania
- County: Maramureș

Government
  - Mayor (2024–2028): Mircea-Aurel Deac (USR)
- Area: 96.04 km^{2} (37.08 sq mi)
- Elevation: 284 m (932 ft)
- Population (2021-12-01): 3,230
  - Density: 33.6/km^{2} (87.1/sq mi)
- Time zone: UTC+02:00 (EET)
  - Summer (DST): UTC+03:00 (EEST)
- Postal code: 437085
- Area code: +(40) 262
- Vehicle reg.: MM
- Website: comunacernesti.ro

Cernești (Hungarian: Csernefalva) is a commune in Maramureș County, Transylvania, Romania: It is composed of seven villages: Brebeni (Brébfalva), Cernești, Ciocotiș (Csókás), Fânațe (Kővárfonác), Izvoarele (Balázsszeg), Măgureni (Nagyhegy), and Trestia (Kötelesmező).

Historical population
Year	Pop.	±%
1880	3,558	—
1900	3,903	+9.7%
1910	4,213	+7.9%
1930	4,046	−4.0%
1956	4,167	+3.0%
1977	4,430	+6.3%
1992	4,059	−8.4%
2002	3,814	−6.0%
2011	3,741	−1.9%
2021	3,230	−13.7%
Source: Census data

At the 2021 census, the commune had a population of 3,230; of those, 84.49% were Romanians and 6.16% Roma.
