= Lăpuș Mountains =

Mountain range in Romania

Coordinates: 47°39′38″N 24°02′29″E

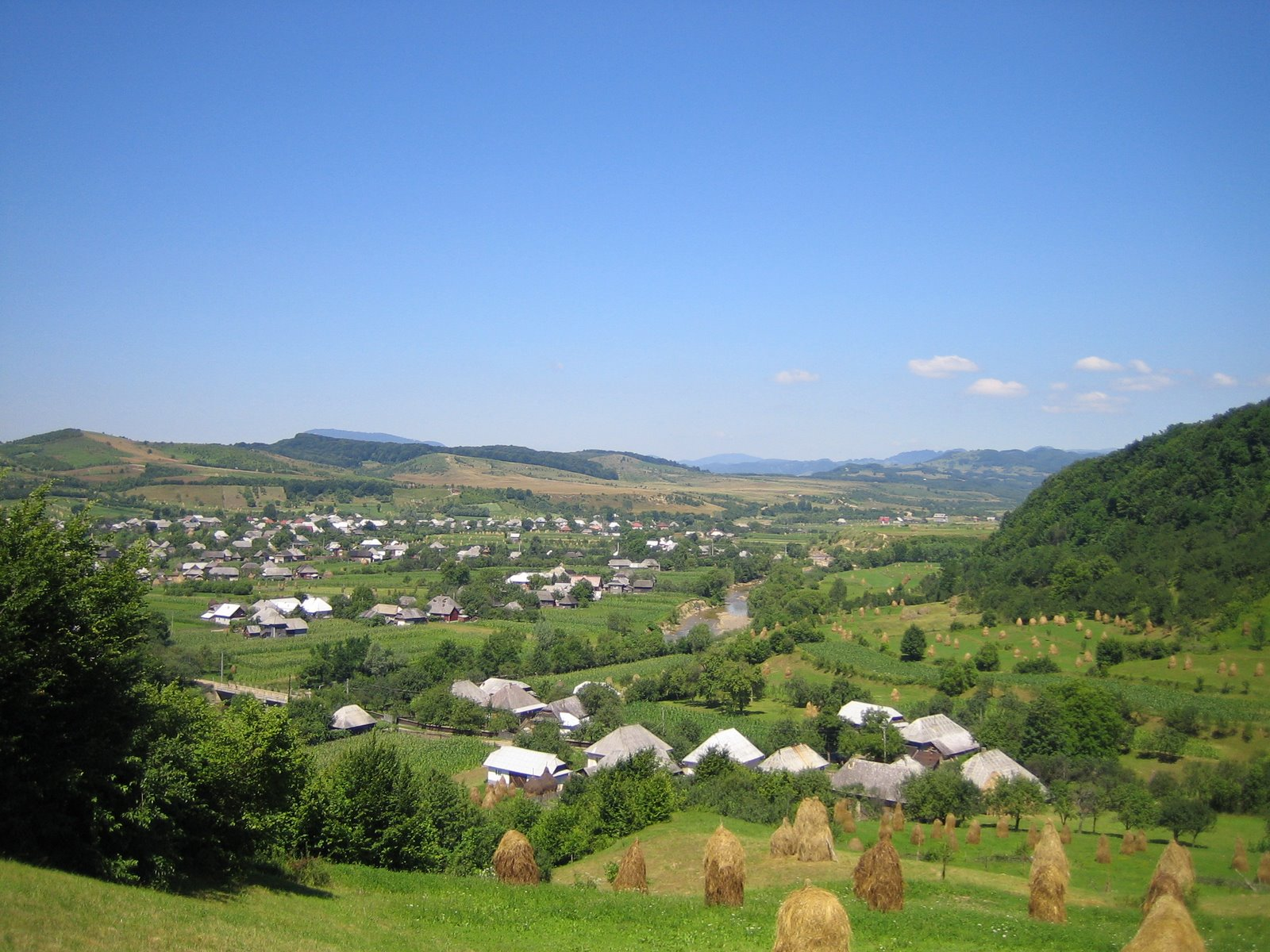
Lăpuş village

The Lăpuș Mountains (Romanian: Munții Lăpușului, Hungarian: Lápos-hegység) are a group of mountains in the Eastern Carpathians, located in the northern Romanian regions of Maramureș and Bukovina. The maximum elevation of these mountains is around 1,800m and a river also with the name Lăpuş runs through the valley.

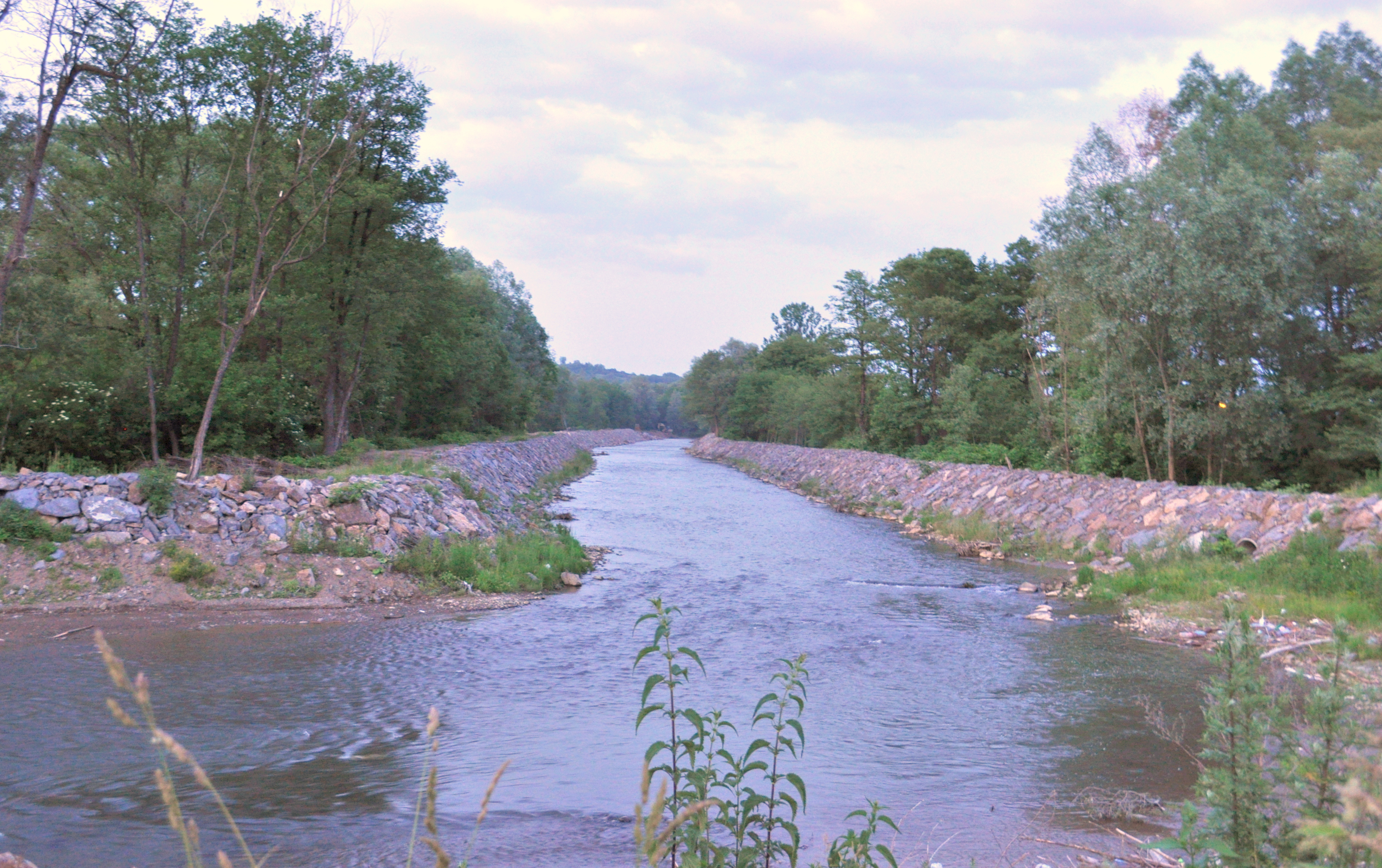
Lăpuş River
