= Satu Mare metropolitan area =

Satu Mare Metropolitan Area
- Metropolitan Area
- Interactive map of Satu Mare Metropolitan Area
- Coordinates: 47°47′N 22°52′E
- Country: Romania
- County: Satu Mare
- Central Municipality: Satu Mare
- Functional: April 26, 2013

Area
  - Total: 2,251.09 km^{2} (869.15 sq mi)

Population
  - Total: 233,306
  - Density: 103.6/km^{2} (268/sq mi)
- Time zone: UTC+2 (EET)
  - Summer (DST): UTC+3 (EEST)
- Postal Code: 44xyz
- Area code: +40 x61^{2}

The Satu Mare Metropolitan Area is a metropolitan area of Romania founded on April 26, 2013 around Satu Mare, the capital city of Satu Mare County. It has a population of 233,306 and, besides Satu Mare, it includes four cities and towns (Carei, Ardud, Livada, and Tășnad), as well as 26 communes.

As defined by Eurostat, the Satu Mare functional urban area has a population of 149,387 residents (as of 2015).

== List of cities, towns and communes ==
Rank	Name	Administrative division	Surface (km^{2})	Population (2011)	Distance to Satu Mare (km)
1	Satu Mare	Municipality	150.3	102,441	-
2	Carei	Municipality	102	21,112	36 km (22 mi)
3	Livada	Town	116	6,773	22 km (14 mi)
4	Tășnad	Town	96.6	8,631	60 km (37 mi)
5	Ardud	Town	140	6,231	45 km (28 mi)
6	Foieni	Commune	40.37	1,840	42 km (26 mi)
7	Berveni	Commune	48.03	3,376	51 km (32 mi)
8	Cămin	Commune	20.02	1,388	40 km (25 mi)
9	Moftin	Commune	125.25	4,293	25 km (16 mi)
10	Craidorolț	Commune	93.52	2,215	25 km (16 mi)
11	Cehal	Commune	65.43	1,594	62 km (39 mi)
12	Terebești	Commune	54.41	1,750	25 km (16 mi)
13	Doba	Commune	60.21	2,760	15 km (9.3 mi)
14	Socond	Commune	88.76	2,641	24 km (15 mi)
15	Beltiug	Commune	117.03	3,228	32 km (20 mi)
16	Viile Satu Mare	Commune	80.59	3,514	22 km (14 mi)
17	Păulești	Commune	41.71	4,909	06 km (3.7 mi)
18	Culciu	Commune	79.30	3,884	20 km (12 mi)
19	Valea Vinului	Commune	88.36	2,067	29 km (18 mi)
20	Dorolț	Commune	30.49	3,806	08.5 km (5.3 mi)
21	Agriș	Commune	30	2,003	14 km (8.7 mi)
22	Micula	Commune	37.77	3,659	18 km (11 mi)
23	Lazuri	Commune	70.72	5,562	08 km (5.0 mi)
24	Odoreu	Commune	47.17	4,946	09 km (5.6 mi)
25	Apa	Commune	44.89	2,681	35 km (22 mi)
26	Orașu Nou	Commune	56	3,806	37 km (23 mi)
27	Racșa	Commune	50.80	3,052	40 km (25 mi)
28	Gherța Mică	Commune	38.85	3,412	44 km (27 mi)
29	Turț	Commune	82.22	5,593	40 km (25 mi)
30	Medieșu Aurit	Commune	103.25	6,683	21 km (13 mi)
31	Vama	Commune	51.04	3,486	45 km (28 mi)

== Sources ==
- "S-a constituit Asociația de Dezvoltare Intercomunitară Zona Metropolitană Satu Mare". Informația Zilei (in Romanian). Informația Zilei Satu Mare. 2013-04-26.
- "Zona Metropolitana Satu Mare va fi constituită vineri". Satu-Mare.Ziare.com (in Romanian). Ziare.com. 2013-04-24.
