= Bârsău (disambiguation) =

Bârsău may refer to several places in Romania:

- Bârsău, a commune in Satu Mare County, composed of Bârsău de Jos and Bârsău de Sus villages
- Bârsău, a village in Hărău Commune, Hunedoara County
- Bârsău Mare, a village in Gâlgău Commune, Sălaj County
- Bârsău (river), a tributary of the Someș in Maramureș County

== See also ==
- Bârsești (disambiguation)
- Bârsa, name of two villages in Romania
- Bârsana, name of two villages in Romania
- Bârsănești, name of two villages in Romania
- Bârsoiu, a village in Vâlcea County, Romania
- Bârsăuța, a village in Sălaj County, Romania

Family name:

- Bârsănescu — search for "Bârsănescu"
