= Bicău =

Tributary of the river Someș in Romania

- Location within Romania

Location
- Country: Romania
- Counties: Satu Mare County
- Villages: Bicău, Pomi, Roșiori

Physical characteristics
- Mouth: Someș
  - location: Roșiori
  - coordinates: 47.7232°N 23.2486°E
- Length: 14 km (8.7 mi)
- Basin size: 37 km^{2} (14 sq mi)

Basin features
- Progression: Someș→ Tisza→ Danube→ Black Sea

The Bicău is a left tributary of the river Someș in Romania. It discharges into the Someș in Roșiori. Its length is 14 km (8.7 mi) and its basin size is 37 km^{2} (14 sq mi).
