= Valea Vinului (Someș) =

- Location within Romania

Location
- Country: Romania
- Counties: Satu Mare County
- Villages: Poiana Codrului, Iegheriște, Crucișor, Valea Vinului

Physical characteristics
- Mouth: Someș
  - coordinates: 47.7291°N 23.1824°E
- Length: 25 km (16 mi)
- Basin size: 69 km^{2} (27 sq mi)

Basin features
- Progression: Someș→ Tisza→ Danube→ Black Sea
- Tributaries
  - left: Văraștina, Măriuș

The Valea Vinului is a left tributary of the river Someș in Romania. It discharges into the Someș in Valea Vinului. Its length is 25 km (16 mi) and its basin size is 69 km^{2} (27 sq mi).
