= Bortura =

Bortura Bârsău
- Location within Romania

Location
- Country: Romania
- Counties: Satu Mare, Maramureș
- Villages: Bârsău de Sus, Bârsău de Jos, Fărcașa

Physical characteristics
- Mouth: Someș
  - location: Fărcașa
  - coordinates: 47.5766°N 23.3371°E
- Length: 19 km (12 mi)
- Basin size: 57 km^{2} (22 sq mi)

Basin features
- Progression: Someș→ Tisza→ Danube→ Black Sea

The Bortura (also: Bârsău) is a left tributary of the river Someș in Romania. It discharges into the Someș in Fărcașa. Its length is 19 km (12 mi) and its basin size is 57 km^{2} (22 sq mi).
