= Homorodul Vechi =

Location
- Country: Romania
- Counties: Satu Mare County
- Villages: Sătmărel; Paulian; Boghiș; Csengerújfalu

Physical characteristics
- Mouth: Someș

Basin features
- Progression: Someș→ Tisza→ Danube→ Black Sea
- Tributaries
  - left: Pârâul Sărat
  - right: Balcaia

The Homorodul Vechi is a tributary of the river Someș in Romania and Hungary. In Romania, its length is 38 km (24 mi) and its basin size is 265 km^{2} (102 sq mi). It crosses the Hungarian border between Boghiș and Csengerújfalu.
