= Balcaia =

- Location within Romania

Location
- Country: Romania
- Counties: Satu Mare County

Physical characteristics
- Mouth: Homorodul Vechi
  - location: Dacia
  - coordinates: 47.7431°N 22.6555°E

Basin features
- Progression: Homorodul Vechi→ Someș→ Tisza→ Danube→ Black Sea

The Balcaia is a right tributary of the river Homorodul Vechi in Romania. It originates near the village of Decebal and flows into the Homorodul Vechi near Dacia. The river is totally channelized and, at present, is part of the drainage system of the Someș plain. Its length is 15 km (9.3 mi) and its basin size is 38 km^{2} (15 sq mi).
