= Iadăra =

Tributary of the river Someș in Romania

- Location within Romania

Location
- Country: Romania
- Counties: Maramureș County
- Villages: Stejera, Iadăra, Tulghieș, Mireșu Mare

Physical characteristics
- Mouth: Someș
  - location: Mireșu Mare
  - coordinates: 47.5230°N 23.3138°E
- Length: 15 km (9.3 mi)
- Basin size: 47 km^{2} (18 sq mi)

Basin features
- Progression: Someș→ Tisza→ Danube→ Black Sea
- Tributaries
  - left: Tulghieș

The Iadăra is a right tributary of the river Someș in Romania. It discharges into the Someș in Mireșu Mare. Its length is 15 km (9.3 mi) and its basin size is 47 km^{2} (18 sq mi).
