= Căpâlna (disambiguation) =

Căpâlna may refer to several places in Romania:

- Căpâlna, a commune in Bihor County
- Căpâlna, a village in Săsciori Commune, Alba County
- Căpâlna de Jos, a village in Jidvei Commune, Alba County
- Căpâlna, a village in Gâlgău Commune, Sălaj County
- Căpâlna de Sus, a village in Mica Commune, Mureș County
