= Cicârlău =

- Commune
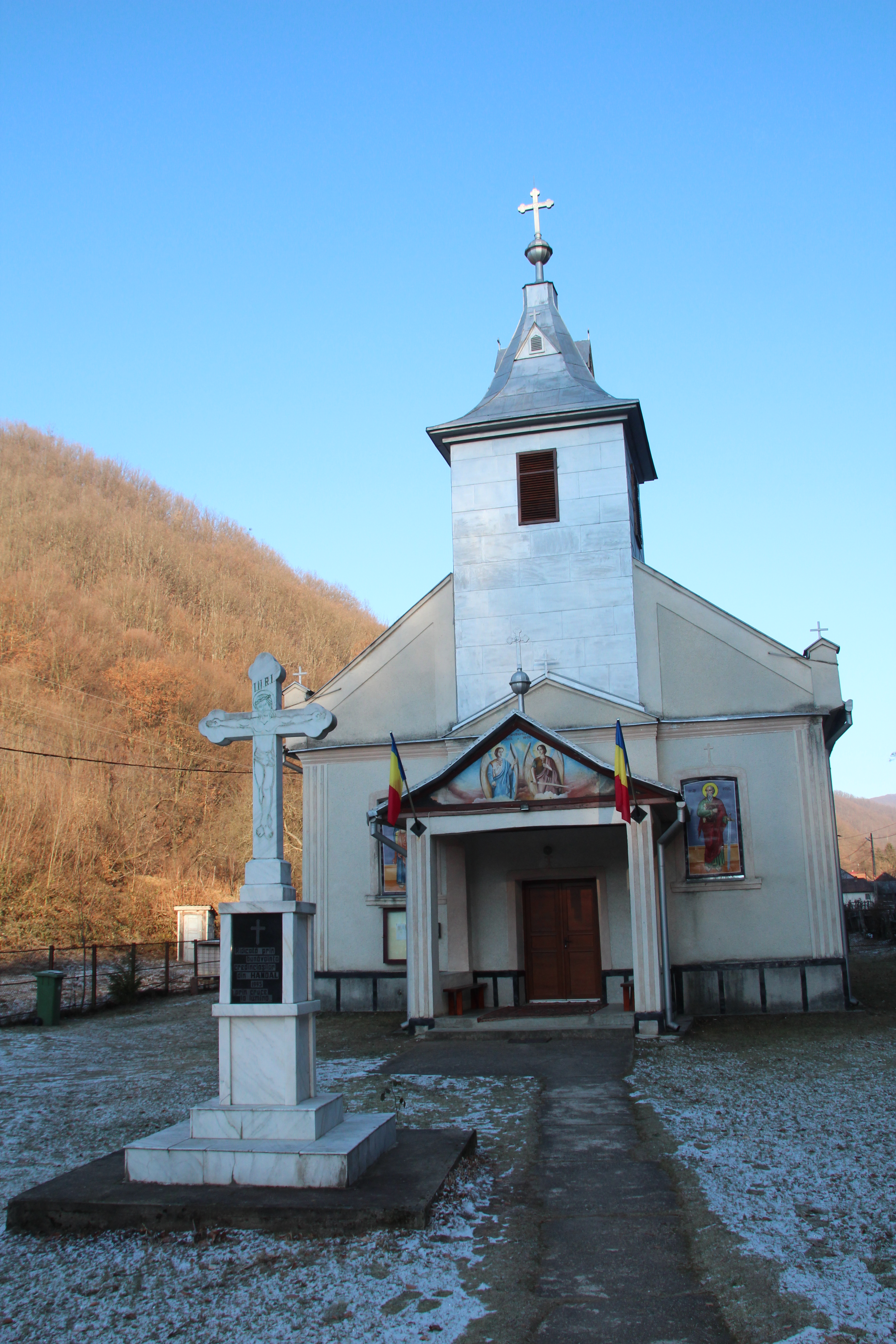
- Orthodox Church in Handalu Ilbei

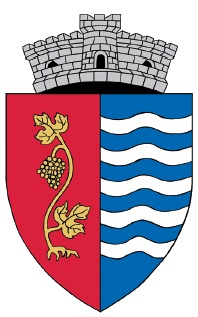
- Coat of arms

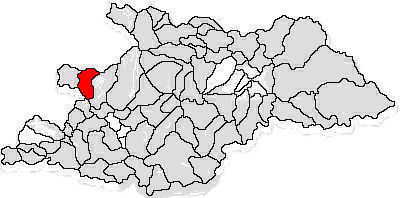
- Location in Maramureș County

- Location in Romania
- Coordinates: 47°42′N 23°24′E
- Country: Romania
- County: Maramureș

Government
  - Mayor (2020–2024): Sorin Lupșe (PSD)
- Area: 75 km^{2} (29 sq mi)
- Elevation: 161 m (528 ft)
- Population (2021-12-01): 3,751
  - Density: 50/km^{2} (130/sq mi)
- Time zone: UTC+02:00 (EET)
  - Summer (DST): UTC+03:00 (EEST)
- Postal code: 437095
- Area code: +40 x59
- Vehicle reg.: MM
- Website: primariacicarlau.ro

Cicârlău (Hungarian: Nagysikárló) is a commune in Maramureș County, Romania. It is composed of four villages: Bârgău (Kissikárló), Cicârlău, Handalu Ilbei (Ilobabánya), and Ilba (Iloba).

== Geography ==
The commune belongs to the Baia Mare metropolitan area. It is located in the western part of Maramureș County, 17 km (11 mi) from the county seat, Baia Mare, on the border with Satu Mare County.

Cicârlău lies on the right bank of the Someș River; the Cicârlău, Ilba, and Nistru rivers flow into Someș within the commune.

The Cicârlău train station serves the CFR Main Line 400, which connects Brașov with Baia Mare and Satu Mare.

Historical population
Year	Pop.	±%
1880	2,088	—
1900	2,425	+16.1%
1910	2,685	+10.7%
1930	2,797	+4.2%
1956	3,520	+25.8%
1977	4,628	+31.5%
1992	4,100	−11.4%
2002	4,013	−2.1%
2011	3,691	−8.0%
2021	3,751	+1.6%
Source: Census data
