= Lipău =

River in Romania

- Location within Romania

Location
- Country: Romania
- Counties: Satu Mare County
- Villages: Lipău

Physical characteristics
- Mouth: Someș
  - location: Lipău
  - coordinates: 47.7328°N 23.1251°E
- Length: 14 km (8.7 mi)
- Basin size: 19 km^{2} (7.3 sq mi)

Basin features
- Progression: Someș→ Tisza→ Danube→ Black Sea

The Lipău is a left tributary of the river Someș in Romania. It discharges into the Someș in the village Lipău. Its length is 14 km (8.7 mi) and its basin size is 19 km^{2} (7.3 sq mi).
