= Valea Porcului River =

Valea Porcului River may refer to:

- Valea Porcului, tributary of the Geoagiu in Hunedoara County, Romania
- Valea Porcului, tributary of the Ilba in Maramureș County, Romania
- Valea Porcului, tributary of the Iza in Maramureș County, Romania
