= Vâtroape =

River in Romania

- Location within Romania

Location
- Country: Romania
- Counties: Sălaj County

Physical characteristics
- Mouth: Someș
  - location: Glod
  - coordinates: 47.2835°N 23.6259°E
- Length: 8 km (5.0 mi)
- Basin size: 26 km^{2} (10 sq mi)

Basin features
- Progression: Someș→ Tisza→ Danube→ Black Sea

The Vâtroape is a right tributary of the river Someș in Romania. It discharges into the Someș in Glod. Its length is 8 km (5.0 mi) and its basin size is 26 km^{2} (10 sq mi).
