= Cuta =

Cuta may refer to:

== People ==
- Cidália Cuta (born 1998), Mozambican football player also known as Ninika

== Places ==
- Cuța, Socond, Romania

== Other ==
- Canadian Urban Transit Association
