= Arieșu =

Arieșu may refer to one of two places in Maramureș County, Romania:

- Arieșu de Câmp, a village in Ardusat Commune
- Arieșu de Pădure, a village in Satulung Commune
