= Someș-Odorhei =

- Commune
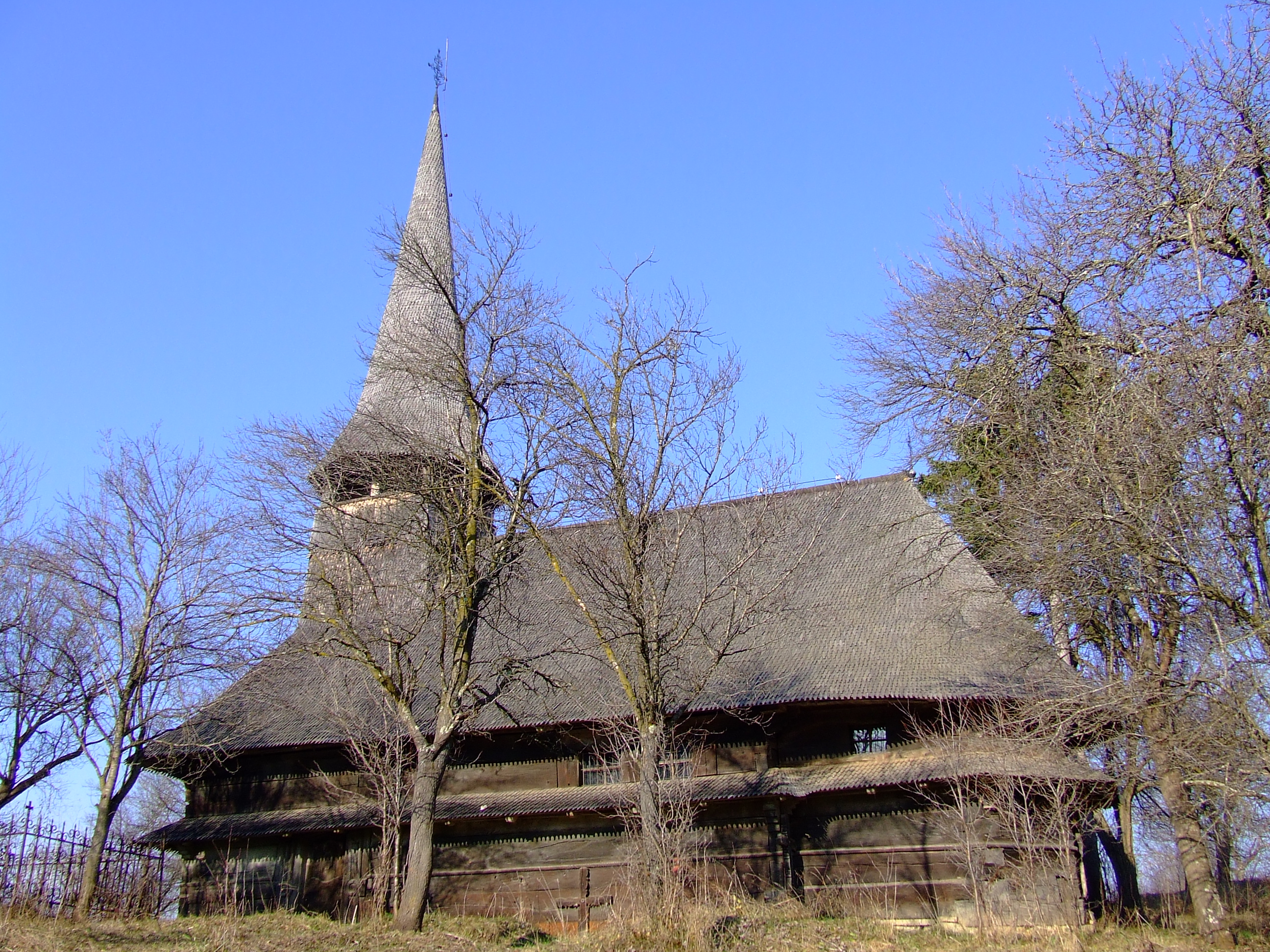
- Wooden Church in Domnin

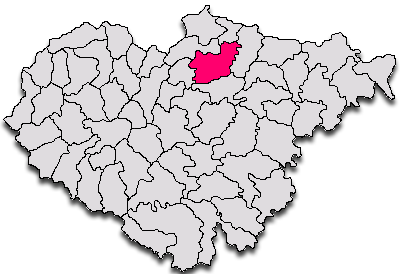
- Location in Sălaj County

- Location in Romania
- Coordinates: 47°19′24″N 23°16′05″E
- Country: Romania
- County: Sălaj

Government
  - Mayor (2020–2024): Ioan Șandor (PNL)
- Area: 78.24 km^{2} (30.21 sq mi)
- Elevation: 184 m (604 ft)
- Population (2021-12-01): 2,678
  - Density: 34.23/km^{2} (88.65/sq mi)
- Time zone: UTC+02:00 (EET)
  - Summer (DST): UTC+03:00 (EEST)
- Postal code: 457310
- Area code: +(40) 260
- Vehicle reg.: SJ
- Website: www.comunasomesodorhei.ro

Someș-Odorhei (Hungarian: Szamosudvarhely) is a commune located in Sălaj County, Crișana, Romania. It is composed of five villages: Bârsa (Dabjonújfalu), Domnin (Dabjon), Inău (Inó), Someș-Odorhei, and Șoimuș (Szilágysolymos).

== Geography ==
The commune lies on the banks of the Someș River and its left tributaries, the Șoimuș and the Bârsa. It is located in the northern part of the county, 8 km (5 mi) north of Jibou, 18 km (11 mi) southeast of Cehu Silvaniei and 32 km (20 mi) northeast of the county seat, Zalău. The Someș-Odorhei train station serves the CFR Line 412, which connects Jibou to Carei, on the Hungarian border.

== Sights ==
- Wooden Church in Bârsa, built in the 18th century, historic monument
- Wooden Church in Domnin, built in the 18th century (1753), historic monument
- Wooden Church in Inău, built in the 19th century (1832), historic monument

== Natives ==
- Nicolae Goldberger (1904 – 1970), communist politician
