= Apateu (disambiguation) =

Apateu is a commune in Arad County, Romania.

Apateu may also refer to:

- "Apt." (song), by Rosé and Bruno Mars
- Apt. (film), a 2006 South Korean horror film
- Apateu, a village in Nojorid Commune, Bihor County, Romania
- Apateu, a village in Culciu Commune, Satu Mare County, Romania
- Apateu, the Romanian name for Körösszegapáti, a village in Hungary
