= Poiana (Someș) =

- Location within Romania

Location
- Country: Romania
- Counties: Maramureș, Sălaj
- Villages: Coroieni, Poiana Blenchii, Gâlgău

Physical characteristics
- Mouth: Someș
  - location: Gâlgău
  - coordinates: 47°16′41″N 23°42′12″E
- Length: 15 km (9.3 mi)
- Basin size: 107 km^{2} (41 sq mi)

Basin features
- Progression: Someș→ Tisza→ Danube→ Black Sea
- Tributaries
  - left: Gostila

The Poiana is a right tributary of the river Someș in Romania. It discharges into the Someș in Gâlgău. Its length is 15 km (9.3 mi) and its basin size is 107 km^{2} (41 sq mi).
