= Leons Briedis =

Latvian writer (1949–2020)

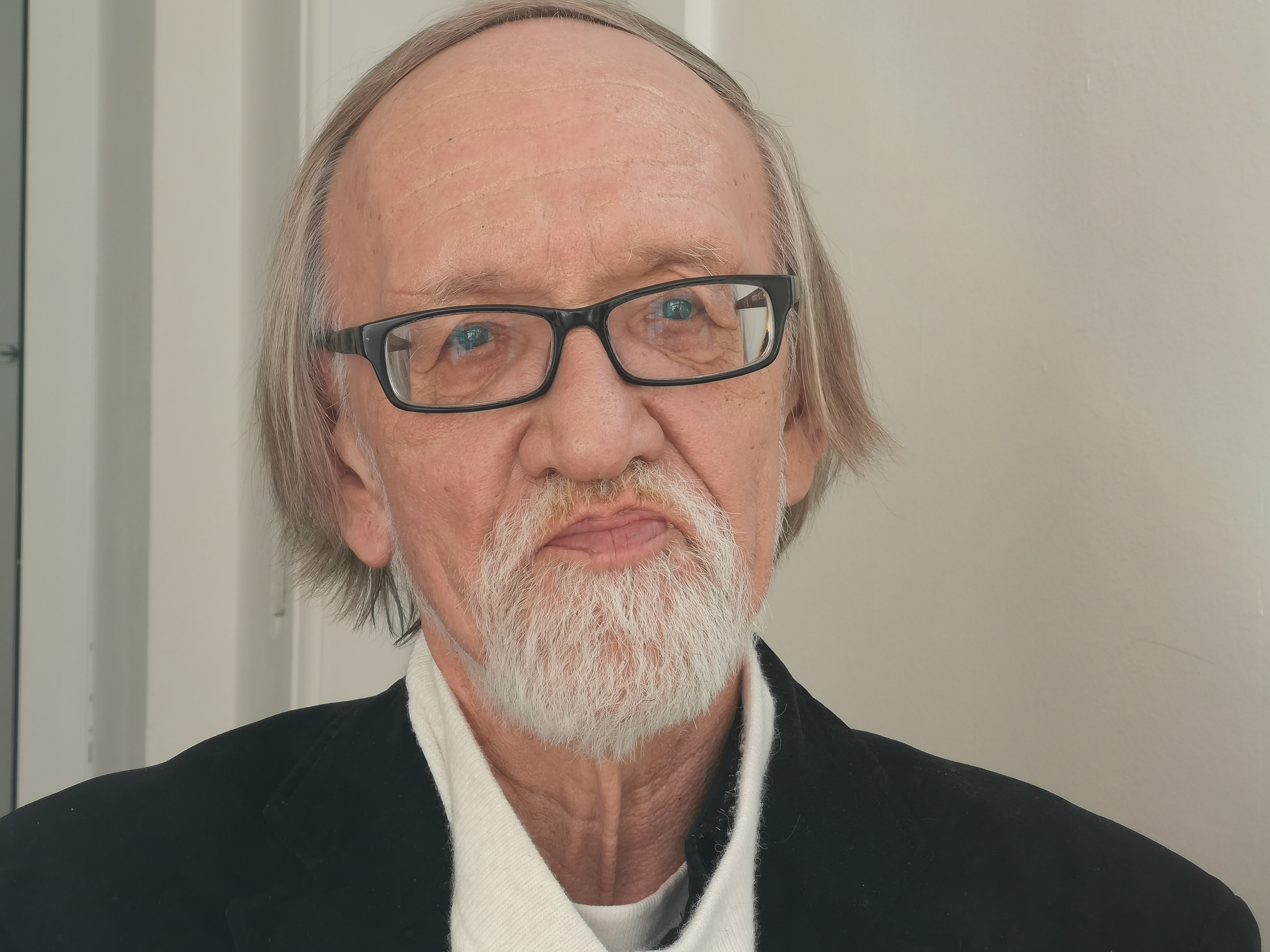
- Born: 16 December 1949; Madona, Latvian SSR, USSR
- Died: 1 February 2020 (aged 70); Riga, Latvia
- Occupations: Writer, poet, essayist, translator, songwriter, publisher, literary critic
- Spouse: Maria Briede-Macovei
- Children: Adrian Briedis-Macovei, Kornēlijs Briedis

Leons Briedis (16 December 1949 – 1 February 2020) was a Latvian poet, a novelist, an essayist, a literary critic and publisher, translator of prose and poetry from Latin, Russian, English, Romance languages (Romanian, Spanish, French, Portuguese, Italian, Catalan, Rhaeto-Romanic), Swahili (of Bantu peoples), Albanian and other languages. He was also an author of several musicals produced on the radio and staged at the biggest theatres in Latvia, script writer (author of several scripts, one short-length film is produced) wrote much for children (poems, prose, plays), author of song texts (in collaboration with the composer Raimonds Pauls, texts for ~150 songs), translated 10 plays staged at Latvian theatres and rendered in verse opera librettos (e.g., the opera by Benjamin Britten "The Small Chimney-Sweep").

== Early life ==
After graduating the Sigulda Secondary School in 1968 he entered the Latvian State University, Day Department of the Latvian Language and Literature Faculty from which he was expelled in 1970 because of anti-Soviet activity without any right to acquire higher education within the territory of the Soviet Union. Despite this, in 1972 Leons Briedis entered the Day Department of Spanish Language and Literature at the University of Chișinău in the Moldavian SSR which in 1974 he was forced to leave due to his links with Moldavian and Romanian democratically minded intelligentsia. From 1977 to 1979 he studied at the Higher Literary Courses of Maxim Gorky Literature Institute in Moscow the theory of translation and Africanistics. L. Briedis for a long time has experienced the pressure of the Central Committee of the Latvian Communist Party and the VDK (KGB) of the Latvian SSR which was manifested as prohibition to publish his works for a certain period, to travel abroad or to take up an employment of ideological character (namely, in publishing houses, schools, editorial offices, etc.).

== Family ==
Leons Briedis was married to Maria Briede-Macovei, whom he met in Chişinău, Moldova. They had two sons.

== Later life ==
Leons Briedis published about 34 books of his own (poetry, prose, essays) as well as 49 books of translations. His poetry books are published in Russian, Romanian and Ukrainian languages, but in general his poetry is translated in practically all languages of Europe and nations of the former Soviet Union as well as many Asian languages (Turkish, Hebrew, Chinese, Japanese, Kirghiz, Uzbek).

From 1974 Briedis was a member of the Latvian Writers' Union (several times also a member of the Board), and from 1987 he was a member of the international organisation of writers (poets, essayists, prosaists) — PEN Club. From 1993 to 1997 he was vice-president of the Latvian PEN Club. He worked in most diverse culture editions and was Head of poetry section of the newspaper "Literatūra un Māksla" (1986–1987), Editor-in-Chief of the cultural journal "Jaunās Grāmatas", culturological magazine "Grāmata" (1990–1992) and Editor-in- Chief of "Vārds", magazine of the Latvian Writers' Union (1993).

In 1992 he founded a private culturological magazine "Kentaurs XXI" and was its Editor-in-Chief till May 2010. The magazine Kentaurs during its existence had not only secured a place and role of its own among other Latvian culture editions, but also acquired international acknowledgment. Several times it had represented Latvia at various international forums (Book Fairs of Munich and Gothenburg, European Congress of Intellectuals in Paris, the 17th European Meeting of Cultural Journals in Tallinn etc.).

Up to now 51 issues of the magazine "Kentaurs XXI" published by L. Briedis had appeared.

Since 1993 he was also the Director of a private Publishing House Minerva, which up to now published 67 humanities-related books of wide profile.

== Awards and honors ==
- For his contribution to understanding of contemporary qualities of poetry, life, and society, Briedis received the "Ojārs Vācietis Award" from the Latvian Association of Writers in 1988.
- In 1989, at the Mihai Eminescu International Festival of Poetry in Romania, Briedis was rewarded with an "Honorary Diploma" of the Romanian Association of Writers. The Latvian National Administration for publishing, printing and circulation awarded Briedis with a diploma for the "Best Translation of the Year" – a selection of Grigore Vieru's poetry.
- In 1999, at the 10th International Poetic Festival dedicated to Lucian Blaga and held in Cluj – Napoca, Romania, L.Briedis received the "Special Award" for his translations of Romanian poetry and for popularization of Romanian culture in Latvia. L. Briedis received the prize of the Romanian Writers' Union, but in 1992 for publication of the culturological magazine "Grāmata" — the Prize of the Ministry of Culture of Latvia.
- In 1997, he received the Award for Social Concord of the Soros Foundation — Latvia for special merit in promotion and development of multicultural relations between nations living in Latvia, since Briedis was one of the initiators of forming the Latvian Association of National Culture Societies and since 1988 actively participated in it.
- In 1999, he received the highest award of the Republic of Latvia, the Order of the Three Stars 3rd Class
- In 2003, he received the award of the Republic of Portugal – the Order of Merit.
- In 2004, he received the award of the Latvian Writers Union for the best translation of the year – the poetry book of the Portuguese poet Eugenio de Andrade "Water nightingale".
- From 2007, he was the honorary member of the Latvian Academy of Sciences and the Institute of the Philosophy and Sociology of Latvia, and also was a life's stipendiary and recipient of the Best Translation of the Year award for the poetry book of the Portuguese poet Fernando Pessoa "The Metaphysical Engineer" and the poetry book of the Italian poet Eugenio Montale "The Men with the Fish - pots" of the Latvian State Culture Capital Foundation.
- Since 2007 he has been an Honorary member of the World Haiku Association (Tokyo) and he received the III award at the 18th Druskininkai International Poetry Festival.
- In 2008 he received the award of the Foreign Ministry of the Republic of Italy for the translation of the work of E. Montale in Latvian and the award of the Latvian Writers Union and Latvian State Culture Capital Foundation for the best translation of the year – the five poetry books of the Brazilian poets Murilo Mendes, Manuel Bandeira, Cecília Meireles, Carlos Drummond de Andrade and Jorge de Lima. Since 2003 he is an Honorary member of the Association of Fernando Pessoa (Lisbon, Portugal).

== Published works ==
- Books of Poetry:
- "Lime Tree, Grass-Snake's Blood" (1974)
- "Time To Cast A Shadow" (1977)
- "A Circle Which Departs" (1981)
- "After Midsummer Night's Eve" (1983)
- "The Garden Of Essence" (1987)
- "The Soul Of Passage" (1988)
- "The Tree Of Sunset" (1994)
- "A Sunday Amidst Eternity" (1994)
- "The Half-Won Freedom" (1995)
- "The Angel Of The Abyss" (1996)
- "Lifestory and 33 Most Recent Poems" (1997)
- "In reddish winter evenings" (1998)
- "Dzedzieda" – I (1998)
- "Dzedzieda" – II (1999)
- "Armour of Shreds" (2000)
- "Dzedzieda" – III" (2000)
- "Without Entering I Go Away from Each Paradise (2004)
- "Early Spring"(sonnets) (2005)
- "The Life of Love" (2008)
- "Let Us Say Nothing"(2009)
- "Twilight Handwriting"(2009)
- "Waves in Desert" (2009)
- Poetry books for children:
- "Here Lopes A Red-Bearded Hare" (1978)
- "The Little Mermaid" (1982)
- "While The Snail Was Out" (1984)
- "The Whiskered Flower" (1990)
- "The Gnome" (2004)
- Books of fairy-tales for children:
- "The Small, The Very Small" (1986)
- "Bearded with Two Beards" (2007)
- Essays:
- "Nidas" (1982)
- "Coeval of the Word" (2003)
- "A Fast, Non – Existent Part" (2008)
- "The Eternal Present", in collab. 1. vol. (2008)
- Prose:
- "Yearning Coloured in Blood" (novel) " (2000).
- Translations:
- Чинэ ку стеле Кишинэу Литература артистикэ 1985
- После Иванова дня Москва Советский писателъ 1986
- Поки равлика не було вдома Киив Веселка 1989
- from Latin: St. Augustine "Confessiones" (Book VIII and XIII); Boethius "On Console in Philosophy (2009); Basilius Plinius "Eulogy of Riga (1997); Juvenalis; Seneca "Letters to Lucilius"; I. Loyola "The Spiritual Exercises"(fragments); F. Petrarca "Book of Letters on Everyday Matters"(fragments);
- from Romanian: T. Arghezi "The Real Words" (1975); L. Damian "I Am A Verb" (1976); Nichita Stanescu "Nothing Is Something Else" (1977); Selected works of Moldavian poets "From The Pink Hills" (1979); Lucian Blaga "The Seller Of Grasshoppers" (1982); Grigore Vieru "Friday Star" (1988); Anna Blandiana "The Snowy Hour" (1989); S. A. Doinas "Born In Utopia" (1999); Gellu Naum "The Traveller Who Sets Ablaze" (1999); I.Malancioiu "Jeronim" (1999); Mircea Dinescu "Terrorisation of the Common Sense" (1999); M. Sorescu "Wells in the Sea"(1999); O. Goga, G. Bacovia; E. Jonesco; E. Botta; I. Voronca; J. Horea; A. Dumbrăveanu; J.Alexandru; G. Tomozei; P. Stoica; E. Jebeleanu; G. Tartler; V. Mihaiu; D. M. Jon, C. Ilica, Nichita Danilov; J. Vieru; J. Flora; J. Pillat; C. Baltag; P. Stoica, E. Jebeleanu, J. Flora, G. Vulturescu, Vasile Moldovan (haiku), Leo Butnaru etc.;

The poets of Moldova ( A. Robot, G. Vode, D. Matcovshi, J. Vatamanu etc.); Z. Stancu "I Loved You So. Kostandina." (1978); P. Salcudeanu "The Death Of A Fashion – model" (1979); S. Vangeli (1979, 1986); Romanian folk -songs for children "ABC muzical" (2007); Christmas songs; the epitaphs of the cemetery of Sapinta (Maramureș); Romanian fairy – tales (1986); Mircea Eliade "At The Gypses"; A. E. Baconsky "Black Abbey" (fragments); Anna Blandiana (stories); the prose of the writers of Moldova: M. Sorescu "Lap"; D. Solomon "Water"; J.Druta (plays); H. Vald (essays); T.Vianu (discources in literary sciences);

- from Aromanian: Hristu Cândroveanu;
- from Italian: sonnets by F. Petrarca ("Canzoniere", 1981); E. Montale "Men with Fish – pots" (2007); G. Leopardi; F. T. Marinetti (poems and manifests); G. Ungaretti; E. Montale; S. Quasimodo; A. T. Guerra; V. Sereni; G. Ballo; V. Ceiken, A. Porta, G. Raboni, M. Muchi, V. Magrelli, G. Giudici, S. Gallon, A. Zanzotto; P. Ruffilli; E. Filipo "The Art Of Comedy"; F.Fellini "Mrs. Rome"; M. Bontempelli "Four Preambles"; M.Ficino; Umberto Eco "Innovation and Repetition";
- from Sardinian: P. Mossa (poems);
- from Friulano: P. P. Pasolini (poems);
- from Rhaeto – Romanic: P. Lansel; A. Per;
- from Catalan: S. Espriu "The Garden with five trees"(2002); P. Quart; G. Ferrater; C. Riba; J. Salvat – Papasseit; V. Panyella, Tx. Martinez Ingles (poetry); P. Kalders (stories);
- from Spanish: Federico García Lorca; R. Alberti "Sailor On Land"; Juan Ramón Jiménez (poems); Juan Ramon Jimenez "Platero and I" (1988, 2004); Jorge Luis Borges; O. Paz; E. Diego; J. Martí; J. Cortázar; C. Vallejo; M. Hernández; L. Cernuda; M. L. Melo; Hernando Quiroga "Anaconda"; R. Darío; J. Goytisolo (essays); José Ortega y Gasset "The Poverty And Brightness Of Translation", "A Theme Of Our Time", fragments of the book "The Man and the Men";
- from French: Mircea Eliade "The Myth Of The Eternal Return" (1995), "The Sacral And Profane" (1996), "Sexualised World" (fragments of the book "Smiths and Metallurgists"; E. Cioran; J. Maritain "Philosopher In The State"; M. Blanchot (essays); P. Aries "Judgements At The End Of Times. The Book Of Life"; H. Bergson (fragments from the books "The Creative Evolution" and "Laughter"); J. Starobinski "The Irony and Melancholy"(fragments); P.Valery (essays); A. Artaud " Theatre and Its Double"; poets of Cameroons (R. Philombe, Ch. Ngande), Senegal (L. Sedar Senghor, D. Diop, B. Diop, M. Fall, S. Usman), Haiti (A. Cesaire), Morocco (M. Bennis);
- from Portuguese: Fernando Pessoa "The Lost Garden (1983, 1999); "The Anthology of the Portuguese Contemporary Poetry" (2001; edition bilingual; 27 authors; 480 pages; the second edition in 2003); E. de Andrade "Water Nightingale" (edition bilingual, 2003); H. Helder "The Continues Poem" (2004); A. Hatherly "Tiny Fibres" (2005); Fernando Pessoa (Alvaro de Campos) "Metaphysical Engineer" (2006); The Anthology of Azorean Poetry (2009); S. de M. Breyner Andresen "The Anemone of the Days"(2010); A. Neto "With Dry Eyes" (1978); C. Pacheco, L. M. Nava, M. Alegre (poems); poets of Angola (A. Santos, A. Cardoso, A. Dascalos, D. Mestre, J. Rocha, G. Rodrigues, M. E. Neto, R. David), Mozambique (J. Craveirinha), Santome e Principe; poets of Brazil: M. Bandeira "A Carnival Wednesday Night's Dream"(2008); J. de Lima "Black Fulo"(2008); C. Meireles "Herdswoman of Clouds"(2008); C. Drummond de Andrade "A House without Roots"(2008); M. Mendes "Church, Woman"(2008); R. Bopp; V. de Morais; M. de Andrade; G. de Almeida; J. Cabral de Melo Neto; H. Costa; Eduíno de Jesus;
- from Galician: Rosalía de Castro:
- from English: T. S. Eliot (poems and essays); W. B. Yeats (essays); S. Beckett (poems); W. Soyinka (poems and plays); E. Fromm "Freedom And Spontaneity"; J. Campbell "Erotic Irony"; G. Greene (essays); M. Eliade "The Aspects of Myth"(1999), "World, City, Home";
- from Icelandic: Sigurdur A. Magnusson (poems);
- from Russian: I. Turgenev; A. Arbuzov; V. Korostilov; J. Akim; J. Kasyanich;
- from Ukrainian: I. Pavliuc, O. Olzych, M. Hvilhovij (poems);
- from Czech: Christmas songs; Milan Hrabal: Cestou bolesti a víry (Ciešanu un Ticības ceļā) - with Adrians Briedis – Macovei
- from Macedonian B. Guzel, B. Višinski, M. Stefanovski (poems);
- from Dutch: H. Huizinga "Homo ludens" (Chapter VII and XII);
- from Albanian: J.Kadare, B.Ymeri, G. Hajdari (poems);
- from Swahili: S. Robert (stories);
- from Afrikaans: B. Breitenbah (poems);
- from Yoruba: Oriki (folk songs);
- from Igbo: Chibo Oneyi (poems).
- from Malagasian: J. Rabemananjara, J. J. Rabearivelo, Radu ( G. Andriamanantena), R. Zanamiotra (poetry) and folks -songs (hainteny).
