= Cheud =

- Location within Romania

Location
- Country: Romania
- Counties: Maramureș, Sălaj
- Villages: Fericea, Cheud

Physical characteristics
- Mouth: Someș
  - location: Cheud
  - coordinates: 47.3845°N 23.3091°E
- Length: 9 km (5.6 mi)
- Basin size: 25 km^{2} (9.7 sq mi)

Basin features
- Progression: Someș→ Tisza→ Danube→ Black Sea

The Cheud is a right tributary of the river Someș in Romania. It discharges into the Someș in the village Cheud. Its length is 9 km (5.6 mi) and its basin size is 25 km^{2} (9.7 sq mi).
