= Arieș (Someș) =

- Location within Romania

Location
- Country: Romania
- Counties: Maramureș County
- Villages: Arieșu de Pădure, Arieșu de Câmp

Physical characteristics
- Mouth: Someș
  - location: Arieșu de Câmp
  - coordinates: 47.6451°N 23.3987°E
- Length: 14 km (8.7 mi)
- Basin size: 35 km^{2} (14 sq mi)

Basin features
- Progression: Someș→ Tisza→ Danube→ Black Sea

The Arieș is a right tributary of the river Someș in Romania. It discharges into the Someș in Arieșu de Câmp. Its length is 14 km (8.7 mi) and its basin size is 35 km^{2} (14 sq mi).
