= Cucu =

Cucu may refer to:

- Cucu, a village in Odoreu Commune, Satu Mare County, Romania
- Cucù, an Italian card game played with special cards
- Mount Cucu, a peak in the Harghita range of mountains in Romania, located on the border between Harghita County and Covasna County
- Ricard Fernández (born 1999), known as Cucu, Andorran footballer
- Stelian Cucu (born 1989), Romanian footballer
