= Ileanda (river) =

- Location within Romania

Location
- Country: Romania
- Counties: Sălaj County
- Villages: Dolheni, Ileanda

Physical characteristics
- Mouth: Someș
  - location: Ileanda
  - coordinates: 47.3303°N 23.5980°E
- Length: 12 km (7.5 mi)
- Basin size: 44 km^{2} (17 sq mi)

Basin features
- Progression: Someș→ Tisza→ Danube→ Black Sea

The Ileanda (Hungarian: Ilonda-patak) is a right tributary of the river Someș in Romania. It discharges into the Someș in the village Ileanda. Its length is 12 km (7.5 mi) and its basin size is 44 km^{2} (17 sq mi).
