= Bârsa (Someș) =

- Location within Romania

Location
- Country: Romania
- Counties: Sălaj County
- Villages: Domnin, Bârsa, Someș-Odorhei

Physical characteristics
- Mouth: Someș
  - location: Someș-Odorhei
  - coordinates: 47.3261°N 23.2811°E
- Length: 10 km (6.2 mi)
- Basin size: 23 km^{2} (8.9 sq mi)

Basin features
- Progression: Someș→ Tisza→ Danube→ Black Sea

The Bârsa is a left tributary of the river Someș in Romania. It discharges into the Someș in Someș-Odorhei. Its length is 10 km (6.2 mi) and its basin size is 23 km^{2} (8.9 sq mi).
