= Horoat =

- Location within Romania

Location
- Country: Romania
- Counties: Sălaj County
- Villages: Horoatu Cehului

Physical characteristics
- Mouth: Someș
  - location: Benesat
  - coordinates: 47.4122°N 23.3072°E
- Length: 9 km (5.6 mi)
- Basin size: 28 km^{2} (11 sq mi)

Basin features
- Progression: Someș→ Tisza→ Danube→ Black Sea

The Horoat is a left tributary of the river Someș in Romania. It discharges into the Someș in Benesat. Its length is 9 km (5.6 mi) and its basin size is 28 km^{2} (11 sq mi).
