= Viile Satu Mare =

Viile Satu Mare Szatmárhegy
- Commune
- Location in Satu Mare County

- Location in Romania
- Coordinates: 47°40′N 22°57′E
- Country: Romania
- County: Satu Mare

Government
  - Mayor (2024–2028): Szabolcs Szűcs (UDMR)
- Area: 80.59 km^{2} (31.12 sq mi)
- Elevation: 158 m (518 ft)
- Population (2021-12-01): 3,950
  - Density: 49.0/km^{2} (127/sq mi)
- Time zone: UTC+02:00 (EET)
  - Summer (DST): UTC+03:00 (EEST)
- Postal code: 447360
- Area code: +40 x59
- Vehicle reg.: SM
- Website: viilesatumare.ro

Viile Satu Mare (Hungarian: Szatmárhegy, Hungarian pronunciation: [ˈsɒtmaːrhɛɟ]) is a commune of 3,950 inhabitants situated in Satu Mare County, Romania. It is composed of five villages: Cionchești (Csonkaitanya), Medișa (Meddes), Tătărești (Résztelek), Tireac (Tirákpuszta), and Viile Satu Mare.

The commune is located in the central part of the county, 19 km (12 mi) southeast of the county seat, Satu Mare; it belongs to the Satu Mare metropolitan area. It lies at an altitude of 158 m (518 ft), on the banks of the river Homorodul Nou.

== Demographics ==
At the 2002 census, the commune had a population of 3,242, of which 46.11% Hungarians, 41.57%Romanians, and 11.69% Roma; according to mother tongue, 47.62% spoke Romanian as their first language, while 47.40% of the population spoke Hungarian. At the 2011 census, there were 3,514 inhabitants, of which 41.26% were Hungarians, 40.52% Romanians, and 13.38% Roma. At the 2021 census, Viile Satu Mare had a population of 3,950 inhabitants, of which 44.05% were Romanians, 35.57% Hungarians, and 13.14% Roma.

Historical population
Year	Pop.	±%
1880	1,361	—
1890	1,467	+7.8%
1900	1,561	+6.4%
1910	1,724	+10.4%
1920	1,784	+3.5%
1930	1,930	+8.2%
1941	2,089	+8.2%
1956	5,051	+141.8%
1966	4,659	−7.8%
1977	4,411	−5.3%
1992	3,244	−26.5%
2002	3,242	−0.1%
2011	3,514	+8.4%
2021	3,950	+12.4%
Source: INS, Census data

== Notable people ==
- Géza Páskándi (1933–1995), Hungarian poet, essayist, playwright, and publicist
- George Vulturescu (born 1951), Romanian poet, literary critic, and magazine editor
