= Bârsești (disambiguation) =

Bârsești is a commune in Vrancea County.

Bârseşti may also refer to several places in Romania:

- Bârsești, a village administered by Târgu Jiu municipality, Gorj County
- Bârsești, a village in Budești Commune, Vâlcea County
- Bârsești, a village in Mihăești Commune, Vâlcea County
- Bârseștii de Jos and Bârseștii de Sus, villages in Tigveni Commune, Argeș County
- Bârseștii de Sus, a village in Sprâncenata Commune, Olt County
- Bârseștii de Jos, a village in Beciu Commune, Teleorman County

== See also ==
- Bârsău (disambiguation)
