= Seinel =

- Location within Romania

Location
- Country: Romania
- Counties: Maramureș County

Physical characteristics
- Mouth: Someș
  - coordinates: 47.7293°N 23.2425°E
- Length: 9 km (5.6 mi)
- Basin size: 21 km^{2} (8.1 sq mi)

Basin features
- Progression: Someș→ Tisza→ Danube→ Black Sea

The Seinel is a right tributary of the river Someș in Romania. It discharges into the Someș in Seini. Its length is 9 km (5.6 mi) and its basin size is 21 km^{2} (8.1 sq mi).
