= Terebești =

- Commune
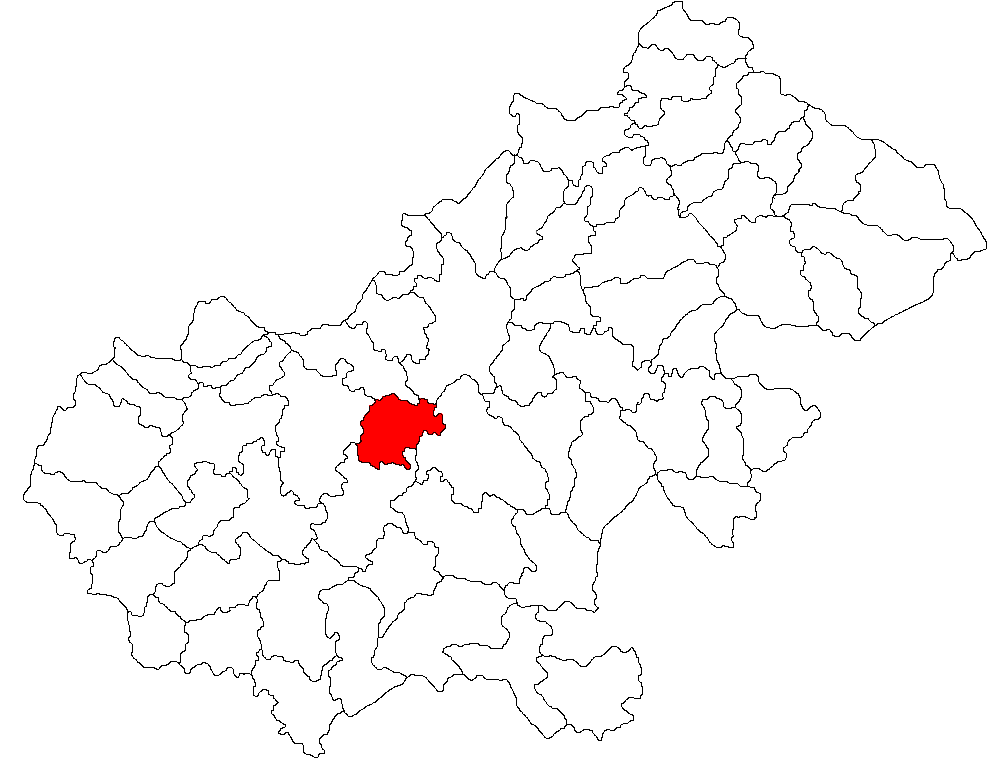
- Location in Satu Mare County

- Location in Romania
- Coordinates: 47°41′N 22°43′E
- Country: Romania
- County: Satu Mare

Government
  - Mayor (2020–2024): Mariana Nicoleta Avorniciți (PSD)
- Area: 54.41 km^{2} (21.01 sq mi)
- Elevation: 120 m (390 ft)
- Population (2021-12-01): 1,864
  - Density: 34/km^{2} (89/sq mi)
- Time zone: EET/EEST (UTC+2/+3)
- Postal code: 447320
- Area code: +(40) x59
- Vehicle reg.: SM
- Website: primariaterebesti.ro

Terebești (Hungarian: Krasznaterebes, pronounced: [ˈkrɒsnɒtɛrɛbɛʃ]) is a commune of 1,864 inhabitants situated in Satu Mare County, Romania. It is composed of four villages: Aliza (Alizmajor), Gelu (Vadaspuszta), Pișcari (Piskáros), and Terebești.

Located in the central part of the county, the commune belongs to the Satu Mare metropolitan area.
