= Șoimuș (Someș) =

- Location within Romania

Location
- Country: Romania
- Counties: Sălaj County
- Villages: Șoimuș

Physical characteristics
- Mouth: Someș
  - location: Downstream of Jibou
  - coordinates: 47.2963°N 23.2733°E
- Length: 10 km (6.2 mi)
- Basin size: 25 km^{2} (9.7 sq mi)

Basin features
- Progression: Someș→ Tisza→ Danube→ Black Sea

The Soimuș is a left tributary of the river Someș in Romania. It discharges into the Someș near Jibou. Its length is 10 km (6.2 mi) and its basin size is 25 km^{2} (9.7 sq mi).
