= Fărcașa =

- Commune
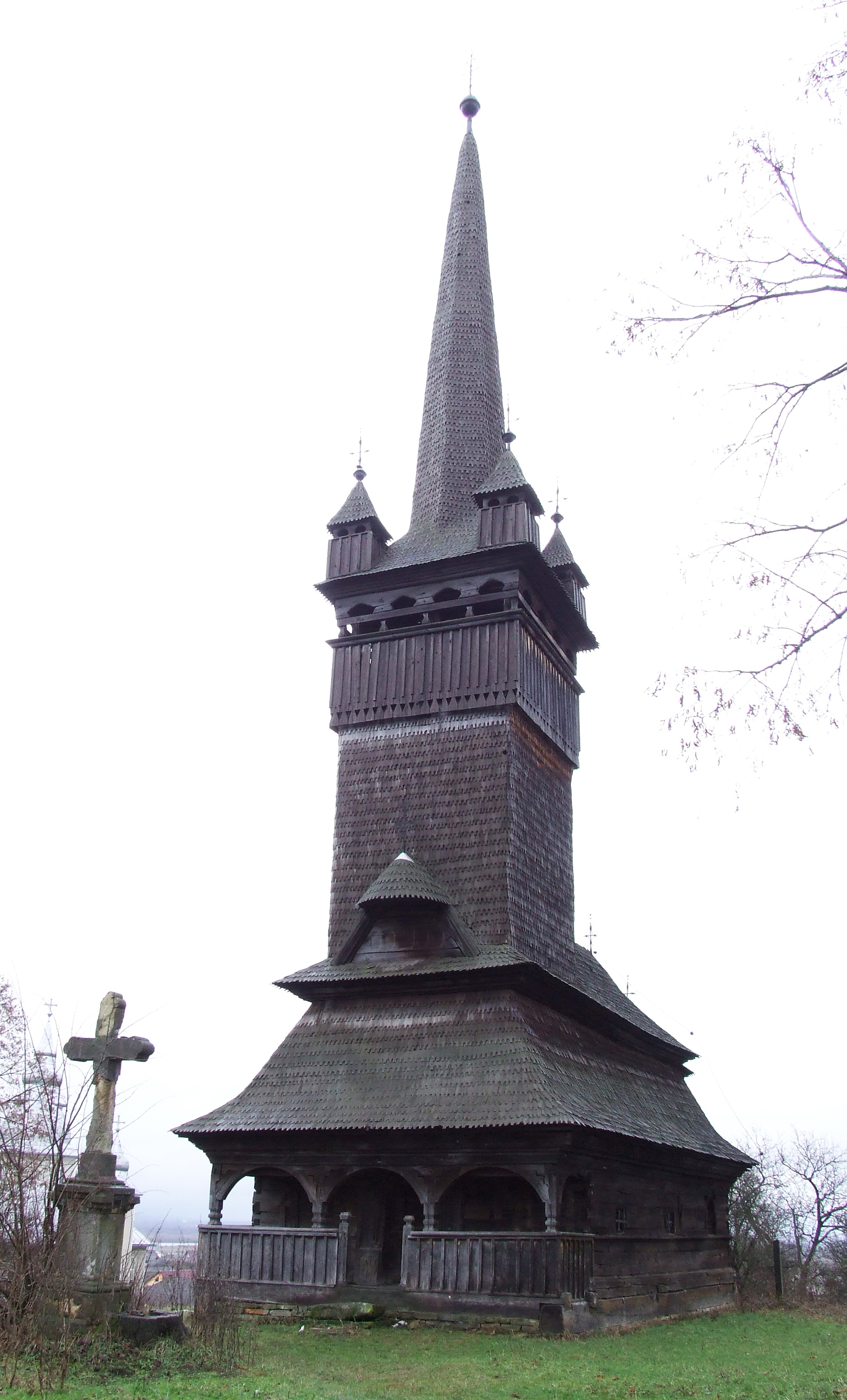
- Wooden church of the Archangels in Buzești

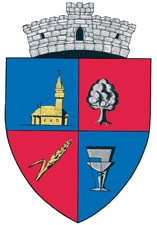
- Coat of arms

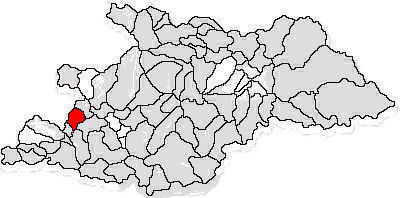
- Location in Maramureș County

- Location in Romania
- Coordinates: 47°35′N 23°20′E
- Country: Romania
- County: Maramureș

Government
  - Mayor (2020–2024): Ioan Stegeran (Ind.)
- Area: 48.41 km^{2} (18.69 sq mi)
- Population (2021-12-01): 4,096
  - Density: 84.61/km^{2} (219.1/sq mi)
- Time zone: UTC+02:00 (EET)
  - Summer (DST): UTC+03:00 (EEST)
- Postal code: 437155
- Area code: +(40) x59
- Vehicle reg.: MM
- Website: www.farcasa-maramures.ro

Fărcașa (Hungarian: Farkasaszó) is a commune in Maramureș County, Romania. It is composed of four villages: Buzești (Szamosújfalu), Fărcașa, Sârbi (Oláhtótfalu), and Tămaia (Tomány).

The commune is located in the western part of the county, on the border with Satu Mare County. It lies on the right bank of the river Someș, at a distance of 27 km (17 mi) from the county seat, Baia Mare.

Historical population
Year	Pop.	±%
1880	2,399	—
1900	2,942	+22.6%
1910	3,050	+3.7%
1930	3,250	+6.6%
1956	3,990	+22.8%
1977	4,396	+10.2%
1992	3,833	−12.8%
2002	3,782	−1.3%
2011	4,015	+6.2%
2021	4,096	+2.0%
Source: Census data

At the 2011 census, Fărcașa had a population of 4,015; of those, 95.64% were ethnic Romanians and 1.54% Roma. At the 2021 census, the commune had 4,096 inhabitants, of which 91.94% were Romanians and 2.12% Roma.

== Natives ==
- Mircea Anca (1960–2015), film actor and director
