= Cicârlău (river) =

- Location within Romania

Location
- Country: Romania
- Counties: Maramureș County
- Villages: Cicârlău

Physical characteristics
- Source: Gutâi Mountains
- Mouth: Someș
  - coordinates: 47.7005°N 23.3630°E

Basin features
- Progression: Someș→ Tisza→ Danube→ Black Sea

The Cicârlău is a right tributary of the river Someș in Romania. It discharges into the Someș in the village Ilba. Its length is 13 km (8.1 mi) and its basin size is 24 km^{2} (9.3 sq mi).
