= Olpret =

- Location within Romania

Location
- Country: Romania
- Counties: Cluj County
- Villages: Oșorhei, Bobâlna, Răzbuneni, Maia, Şomcutu Mic, Viile Dejului

Physical characteristics
- Mouth: Someș
  - location: Downstream of Dej
  - coordinates: 47.1616°N 23.8491°E
- Length: 26 km (16 mi)
- Basin size: 143 km^{2} (55 sq mi)

Basin features
- Progression: Someș→ Tisza→ Danube→ Black Sea

The Olpret is a left tributary of the river Someș in Romania. It discharges into the Someș near Dej. Its length is 26 km (16 mi) and its basin size is 143 km^{2} (55 sq mi).
