= Micula =

Micula Mikola
- Commune
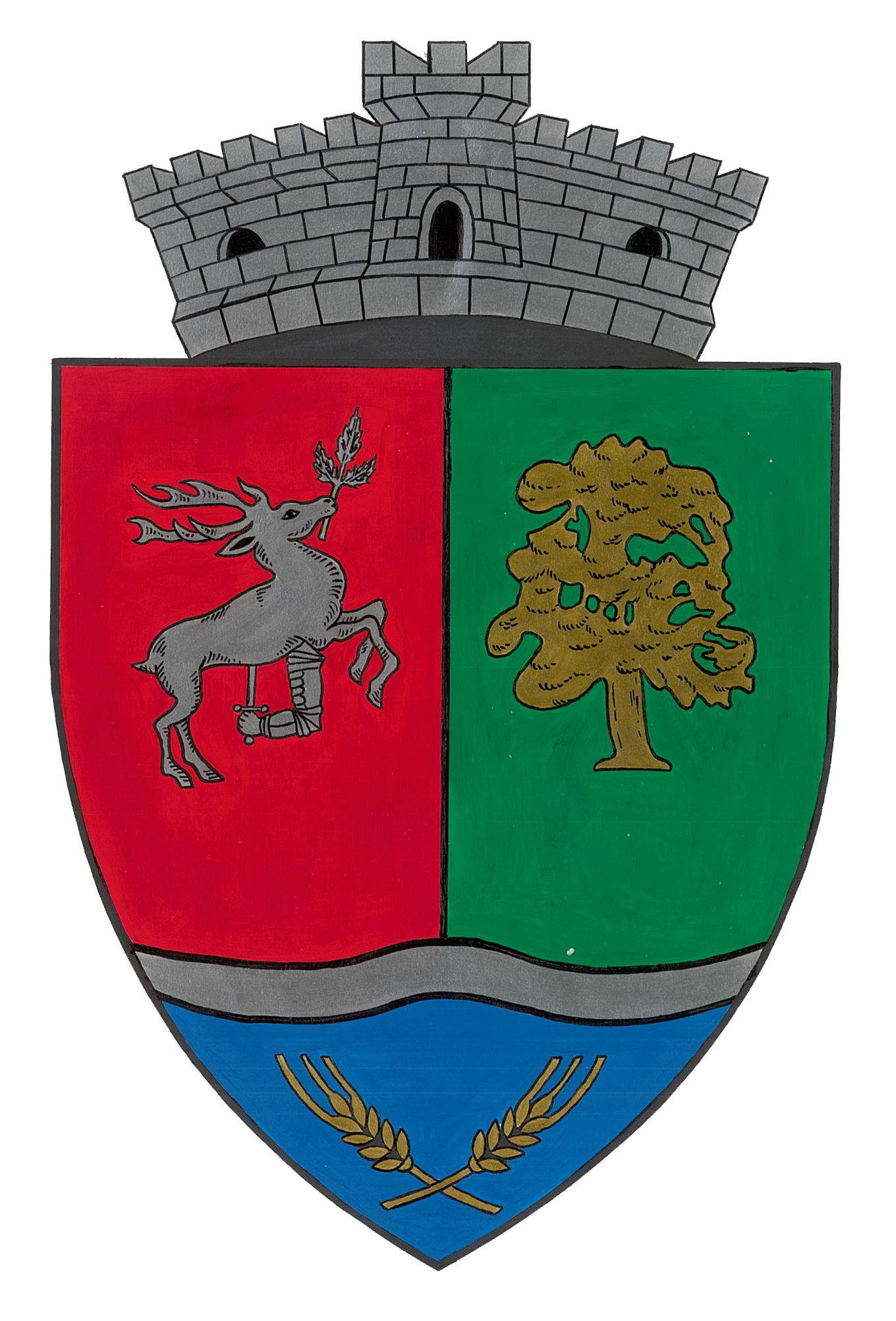
- Coat of arms

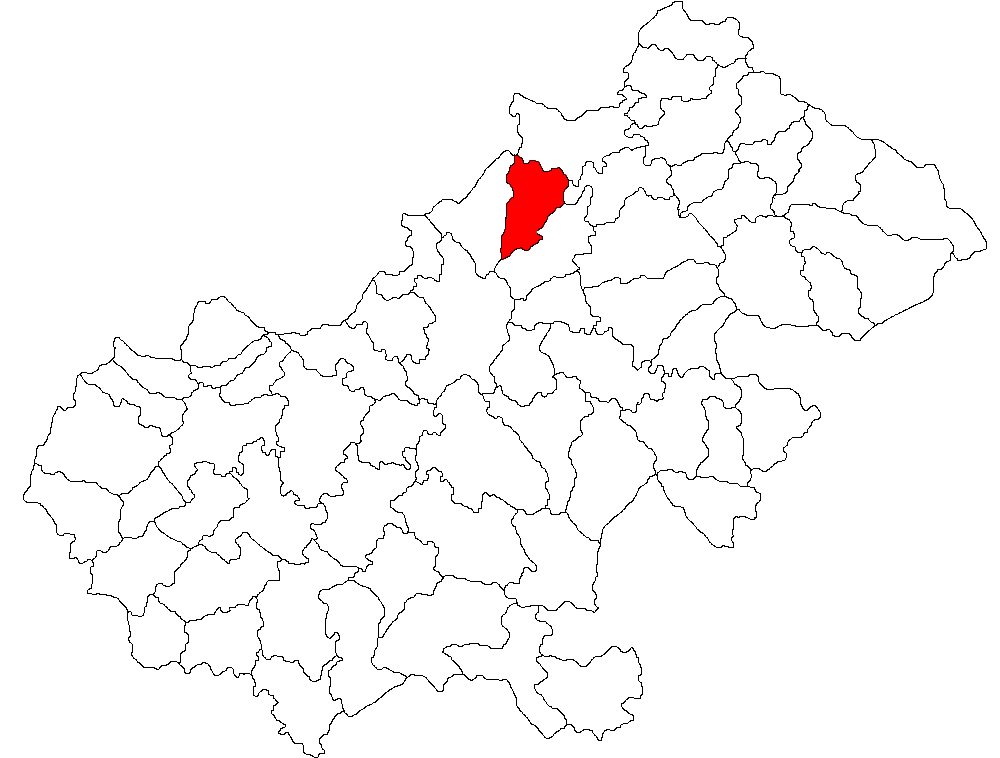
- Location in Satu Mare County

- Location in Romania
- Coordinates: 47°54′N 22°57′E
- Country: Romania
- County: Satu Mare

Government
  - Mayor (2020–2024): Stefan Dobos (UDMR)
- Area: 37.70 km^{2} (14.56 sq mi)
- Elevation: 124 m (407 ft)
- Population (2021-12-01): 3,265
  - Density: 87/km^{2} (220/sq mi)
- Time zone: EET/EEST (UTC+2/+3)
- Postal code: 447195
- Area code: +(40) 261
- Vehicle reg.: SM
- Website: comunamicula.ro

Micula (Hungarian: Mikola, Hungarian pronunciation: [ˈmikolɒ]) is a commune situated in Satu Mare County, Romania. It is composed of three villages: Bercu Nou (Újberek), Micula, and Micula Nouă (Újmikola).

The commune is located in the north-central part of the county, 15 km (9.3 mi) from the county seat, Satu Mare. Since 2013, it belongs to the Satu Mare metropolitan area.

== Demographics ==
At the 2002 census, the commune had a population of 3,783; of those, 38.43% were Romanians, 38.48% Hungarians, and 6.47% Roma. According to mother tongue, 39.65% of the population spoke Hungarian as their first language, while 39.51% spoke Romanian. At the 2011 census, there were 3,659 inhabitants, including 36.02% Hungarians, 32.25% Romanians, 15.85% Ukrainians, and 8.66% Roma. At the 2021 census, Micula had a population of 3,265, of which 32.28% were Hungarians, 29.56% Romanians, 15.99% Ukrainians, and 10.51% Roma.
