= Mireșu Mare =

- Commune
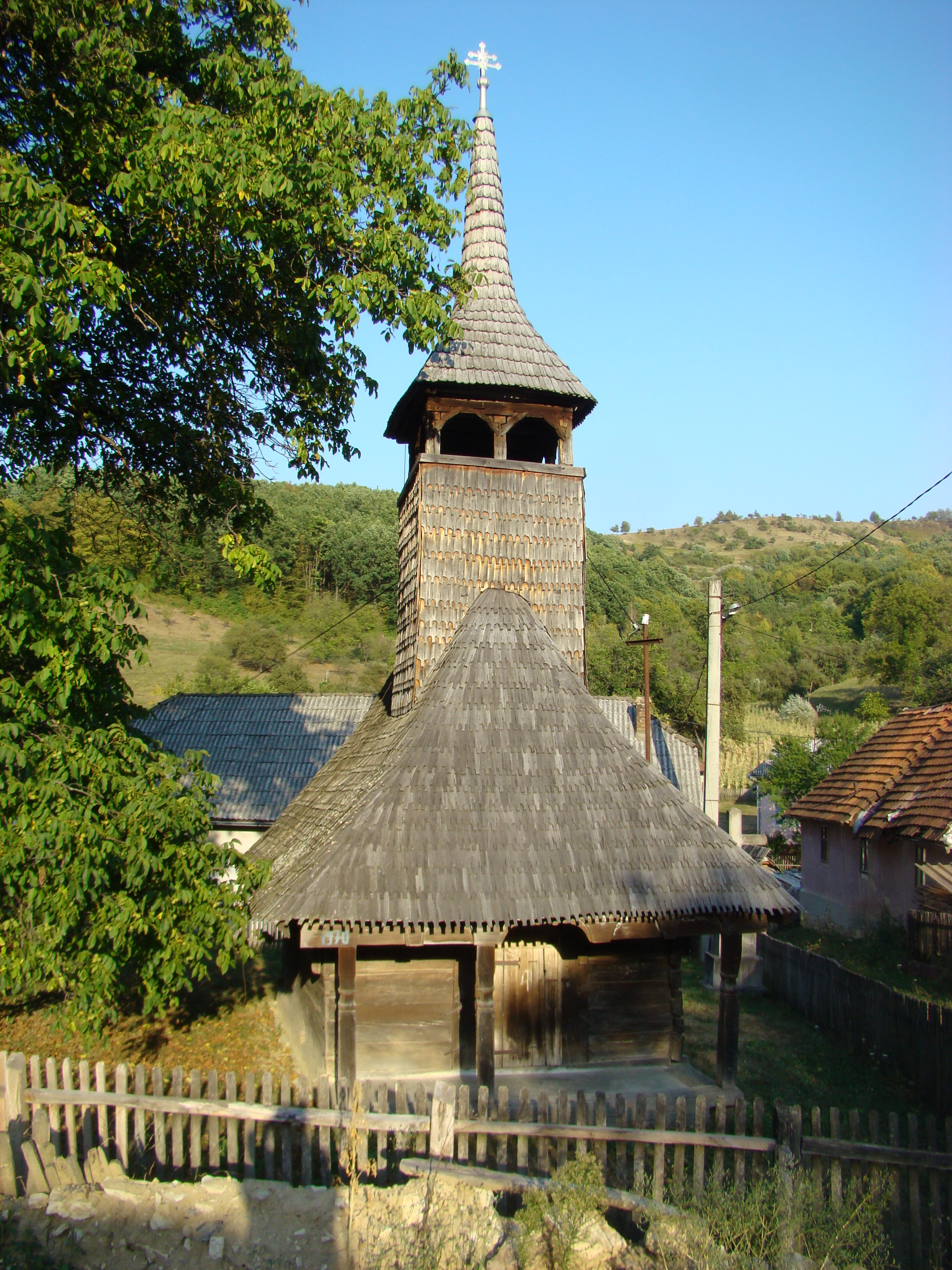
- Pious Saint Paraskeva's wooden church in Stejera

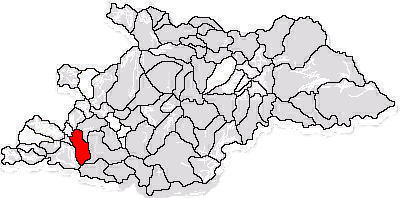
- Location in Maramureș County

- Location in Romania
- Coordinates: 47°30′N 23°20′E
- Country: Romania
- County: Maramureș

Government
  - Mayor (2020–2024): Ioan Mătieș (PNL)
- Area: 73.66 km^{2} (28.44 sq mi)
- Population (2021-12-01): 5,030
  - Density: 68.3/km^{2} (177/sq mi)
- Time zone: UTC+02:00 (EET)
  - Summer (DST): UTC+03:00 (EEST)
- Postal code: 437185
- Area code: +40 x59
- Vehicle reg.: MM
- Website: miresu-mare.ro

Mireșu Mare (Hungarian: Nagynyíres) is a commune in Maramureș County, northwestern Romania. It is located near Ulmeni, on the right, eastern bank of the river Someș. The commune is composed of seven villages: Dăneștii Chioarului (Dánfalva), Iadăra (Jeder), Lucăcești (Szamoslukácsi), Mireșu Mare, Remeți pe Someș (Gyökeres), Stejera (Jávorfalu), and Tulghieș (Szamostölgyes).

== Geography ==
The commune belongs to the Baia Mare metropolitan area. It is located in the southwestern part of the Maramureș County, 29 km (18 mi) from the county seat, Baia Mare.

The Mireșu Mare train station serves the CFR Main Line 400, which connects Brașov with Baia Mare and Satu Mare.

== Demographics ==
Historical population
Year	Pop.	±%
1880	3,439	—
1900	4,049	+17.7%
1910	4,201	+3.8%
1930	4,722	+12.4%
1956	5,453	+15.5%
1977	5,948	+9.1%
1992	5,365	−9.8%
2002	5,130	−4.4%
2011	4,766	−7.1%
2021	5,030	+5.5%
Source: Census data

According to the 2021 census, the population of Mireșu Mare commune was 5,030 inhabitants, an increase from the previous census in 2011, when 4,766 inhabitants were recorded. The majority of the population are Romanians (92.7%), with a minority of Roma (1.77%), while for 5.13% the ethnicity is not specified. From a religious perspective, most inhabitants are Romanian Orthodox (74.51%), with minorities of Pentecostal (11.19%), Jehovah’s Witnesses (3.64%), Greek Catholics (2.94%), and Baptist (1.35%); for 5.37% the religious affiliation is not specified.

== Politics and administration ==
The commune of Mireșu Mare is administered by a mayor and a local council composed of 13 councillors. The mayor, Ioan Mătieș, from the Social Democratic Party, has been in office since 2016. As of the 2024 local elections, the local council has the following political party composition:

Party	Seats in 2024	Current Council
Social Democratic Party (PSD)	8	
National Liberal Party (PNL)	4	
Alliance for the Union of Romanians (AUR)	1	
