= George Vulturescu =

Romanian poet and publicist

George Vulturescu (born March 1, 1951, birth name: Pop Silaghi Gheorghe) is a Romanian poet, literary critic, and magazine editor.

== Biography ==
Pop Silaghi Gheorghe was born in the village of Tireac, Viile Satu Mare commune. He took the pen name George Vulturescu with his literary debut, a poem, in 1971. He graduated from the faculty of philology in University of Cluj-Napoca and returned to Satu Mare.

He is married and has a son.

== Books ==
As of 2011, his work included 12 volumes of poetry and three of literary criticism.
