= Năpradea =

- Commune
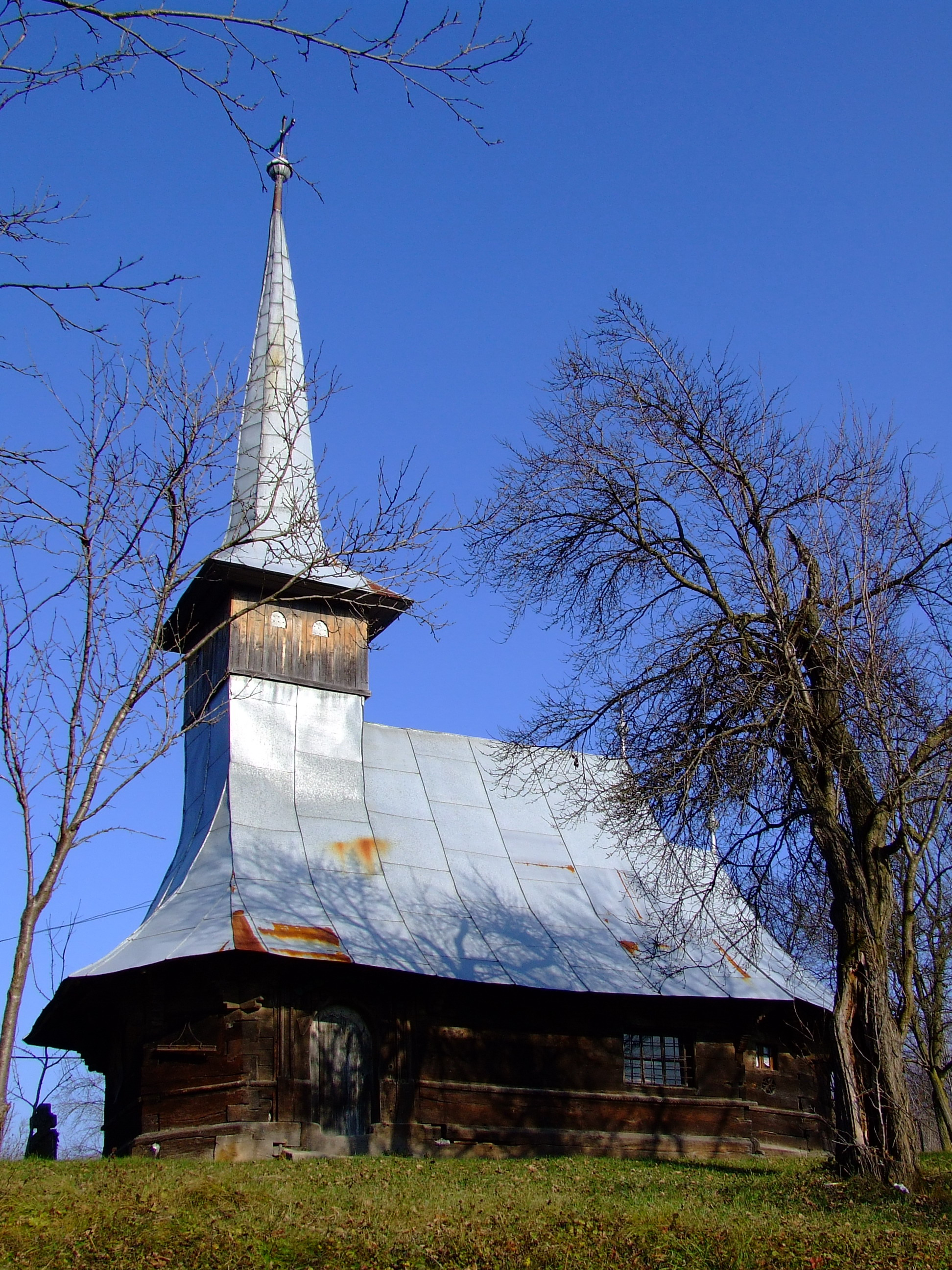
- Wooden Church in Vădurele

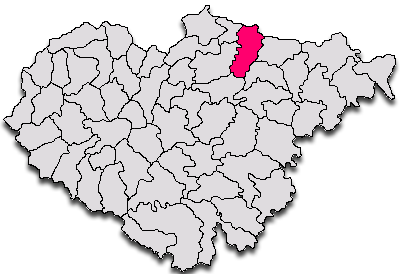
- Location in Sălaj County

- Location in Romania
- Coordinates: 47°21′53″N 23°19′07″E
- Country: Romania
- County: Sălaj

Government
  - Mayor (2020–2024): Vasile Fodor (PNL)
- Area: 68.49 km^{2} (26.44 sq mi)
- Elevation: 192 m (630 ft)
- Population (2021-12-01): 2,633
  - Density: 38.44/km^{2} (99.57/sq mi)
- Time zone: UTC+02:00 (EET)
  - Summer (DST): UTC+03:00 (EEST)
- Postal code: 457255
- Area code: +(40) 260
- Vehicle reg.: SJ
- Website: primarianapradea.ro

Năpradea (Hungarian: Náprád) is a commune located in Sălaj County, Crișana, Romania. It is composed of five villages: Cheud (Köd), Năpradea, Someș-Guruslău (Nagygoroszló), Traniș (Kisgoroszló), and Vădurele (Szamosdebrecen).

== Sights ==
- Wooden Church in Vădurele, built in the 17th century, historic monument
- Orthodox Church in Cheud, built in 1894
- Village Museum in Năpradea
- Aranyos Citadel in Cheud, medieval fortress built in the 12th century, historic monument
- Moșul and Baba stones, Natural reserve in Someș Guruslău
