= Crucișor =

Crucişor
- Commune
- Location in Satu Mare County

- Location in Romania
- Coordinates: 47°41′N 23°15′E
- Country: Romania
- County: Satu Mare
- Population (2021-12-01): 2,195
- Time zone: EET/EEST (UTC+2/+3)
- Vehicle reg.: SM

Crucișor (Hungarian: Borválaszút, pronounced: [ˈborvaːlɒsuːt]) is a commune of 2,226 inhabitants situated in Satu Mare County, Romania. It is composed of three villages: Crucișor, Iegheriște (Alsóhuta) and Poiana Codrului (Szelestyehuta, Glashütte).
