= Odoreu =

- Commune
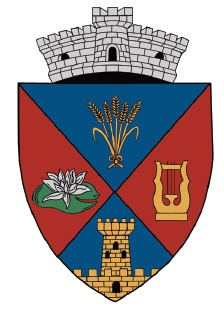
- Coat of arms

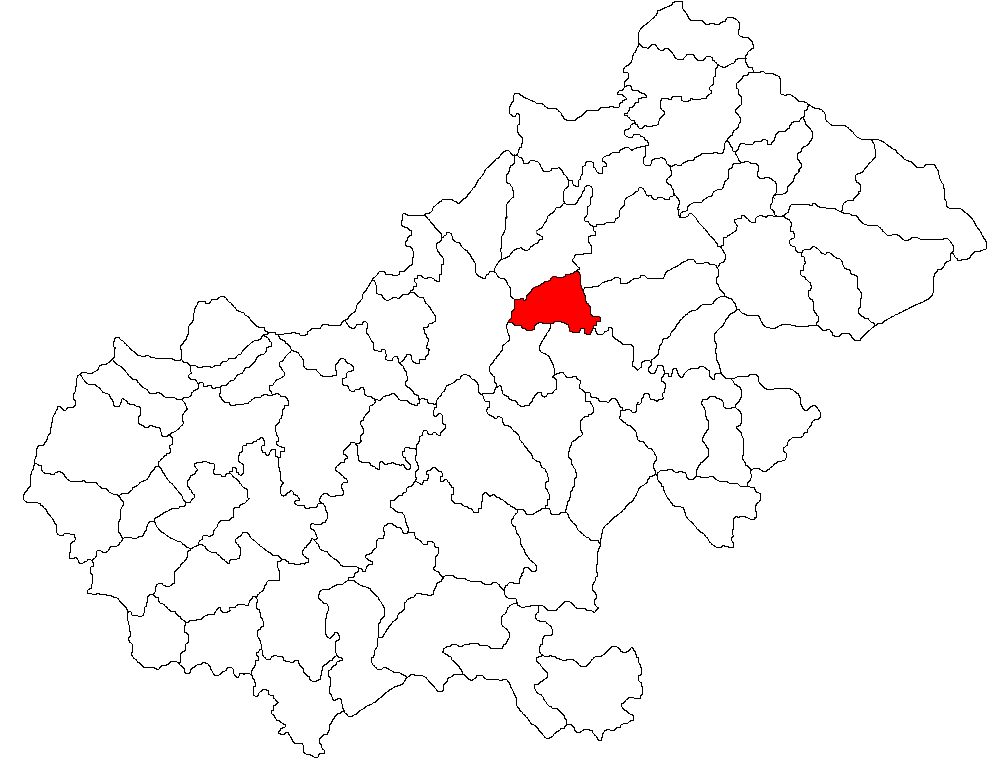
- Location in Satu Mare County

- Location in Romania
- Coordinates: 47°48′N 23°0′E
- Country: Romania
- County: Satu Mare

Government
  - Mayor (2020–2024): Dumitru Dorel Pop (PNL)
- Area: 47.17 km^{2} (18.21 sq mi)
- Elevation: 129 m (423 ft)
- Population (2021-12-01): 5,569
  - Density: 120/km^{2} (310/sq mi)
- Time zone: EET/EEST (UTC+2/+3)
- Postal code: 447210
- Area code: +(40) 261
- Vehicle reg.: SM
- Website: www.odoreu.ro

Odoreu (Hungarian: Szatmárudvari, pronounced [ˈsɒtmaːrudvɒri]) is a commune situated in Satu Mare County, Romania. It is composed of six villages: Berindan (Berend), Cucu, Eteni, Mărtinești (Krasznaszentmárton), Odoreu, and Vânătorești (Gombáserdő).

The commune is located in the north-central part of the county, just east of the county seat, Satu Mare. Since 2013, it belongs to the Satu Mare metropolitan area. It is crossed by the national road DN19F, which connects the county seat to Apa. The Odoreu train station serves the CFR Main Line 400, which runs from Brașov to Satu Mare.

== Demographics ==
At the 2002 census, the commune had a population of 4,855; of those, 69.33% were Romanians, 26.77% Hungarians, and 3.46% Roma. According to mother tongue, 69.45% spoke Romanian as their first language and 30.33% of the population spoke Hungarian. At the 2011 census, there were 4,946 inhabitants, including 65.77% Romanians, 23.21% Hungarians, and 7% Roma. At the 2021 census, Odoreu had a population of 5,569, of which 65.27% were Romanians, 18.24% Hungarians, and 6.03% Roma.
