= Csengerújfalu =

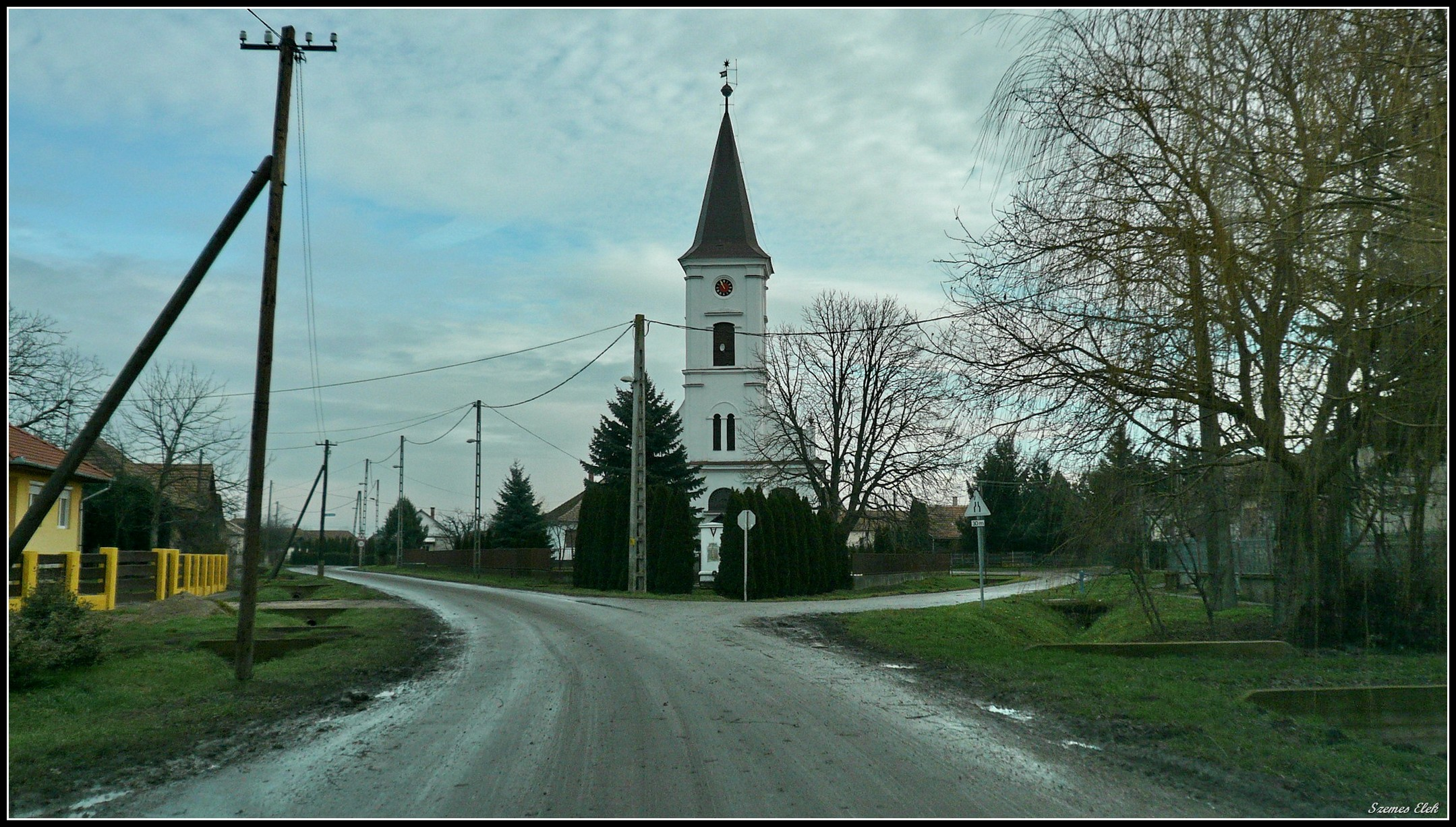

- Location of Csengerújfalu in Hungary
- Coordinates: 47.8°N 22.63°E
- Country: Hungary
- Region: Northern Great Plain
- County: Szabolcs-Szatmár-Bereg

Area
  - Total: 25.61 km^{2} (9.89 sq mi)

Population (2012)
  - Total: 777
  - Density: 30.3/km^{2} (78.6/sq mi)
- Time zone: UTC+1 (CET)
  - Summer (DST): UTC+2 (CEST)
- Postal code: 4764
- Area code: +36 44
- Website: http://csengerujfalu.hu/

Csengerújfalu (Romanian: Uifalău) is a village in Szabolcs-Szatmár-Bereg county, in the Northern Great Plain region of eastern Hungary.

== Geography ==
It covers an area of 25.61 km^{2} (10 sq mi) and has a population of 892 people (2001).
