= Pomi =

- Commune
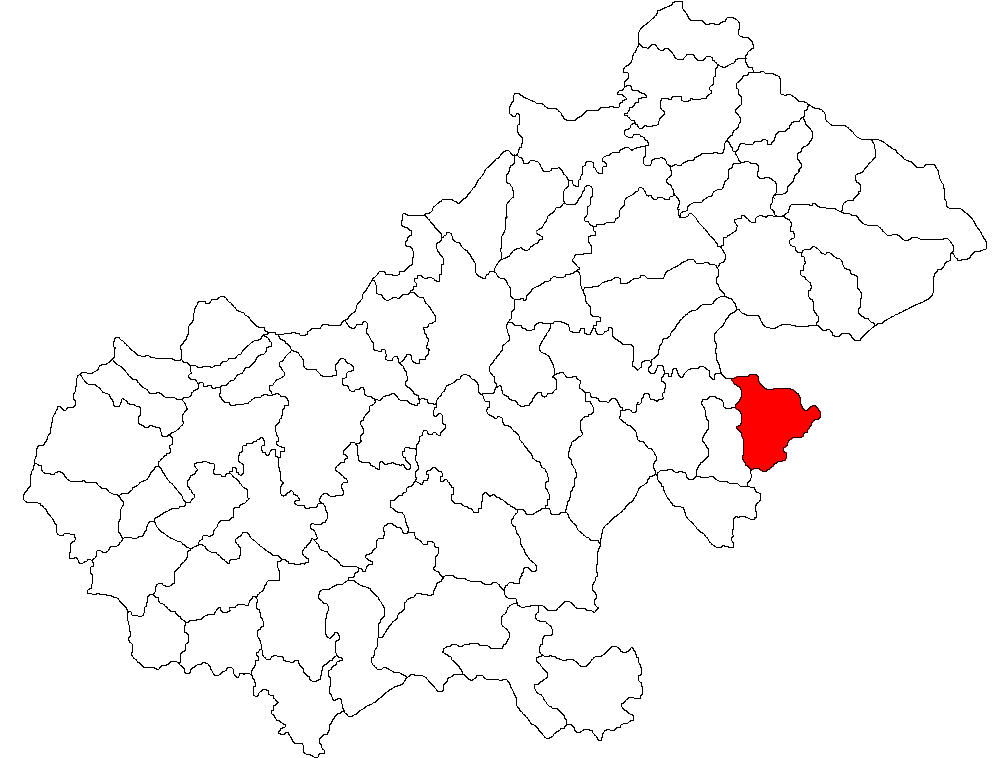
- Location in Satu Mare County

- Location in Romania
- Coordinates: 47°42′N 23°19′E
- Country: Romania
- County: Satu Mare

Government
  - Mayor (2020–2024): Cosmin-Ionel Krișan (PSD)
- Area: 57.93 km^{2} (22.37 sq mi)
- Elevation: 146 m (479 ft)
- Population (2021-12-01): 1,936
  - Density: 33/km^{2} (87/sq mi)
- Time zone: EET/EEST (UTC+2/+3)
- Postal code: 447255
- Area code: +(40) 261
- Vehicle reg.: SM
- Website: primariapomi.ro

Pomi (Hungarian: Remetemező; Hungarian pronunciation: [ˈrɛmɛtɛmɛzøː]) is a commune of 1,936 inhabitants situated in Satu Mare County, Romania. It is composed of four villages: Aciua (Balotafalu), Bicău (Papbikó), Borlești (Barlafalu), and Pomi.

The commune is located in the eastern part of the county, on the border with Maramureș County.

Historical population
Year	Pop.	±%
1880	3,628	—
1890	3,694	+1.8%
1900	3,982	+7.8%
1910	4,145	+4.1%
1920	3,860	−6.9%
1930	3,981	+3.1%
1941	4,208	+5.7%
1966	4,150	−1.4%
1977	3,588	−13.5%
1992	2,604	−27.4%
2002	2,374	−8.8%
2011	2,182	−8.1%
2021	1,936	−11.3%
Source: Census data
