= Ilba (river) =

Ilba Handal
- Location within Romania

Location
- Country: Romania
- Counties: Maramureș County
- Villages: Ilba

Physical characteristics
- Mouth: Someș
  - location: Ilba
  - coordinates: 47°42′24″N 23°21′7″E
- Length: 10 km (6.2 mi)
- Basin size: 31 km^{2} (12 sq mi)

Basin features
- Progression: Someș→ Tisza→ Danube→ Black Sea
- Tributaries
  - left: Valea Porcului

The Ilba or Handal is a right tributary of the river Someș in Romania. It discharges into the Someș in the village Ilba. Its length is 10 km (6.2 mi) and its basin size is 31 km^{2} (12 sq mi).
