= Socond =

- Commune
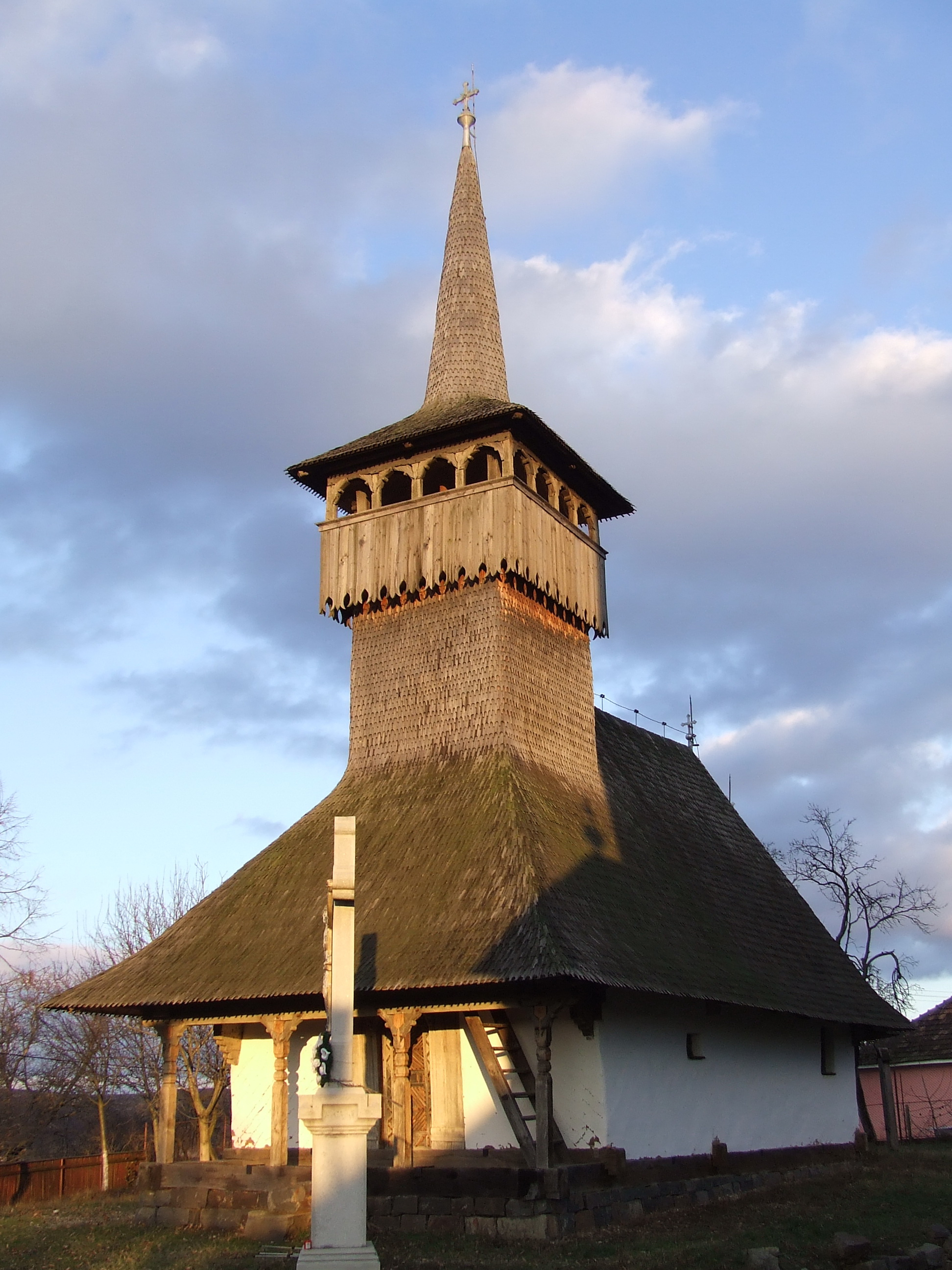
- Wooden church in Stâna

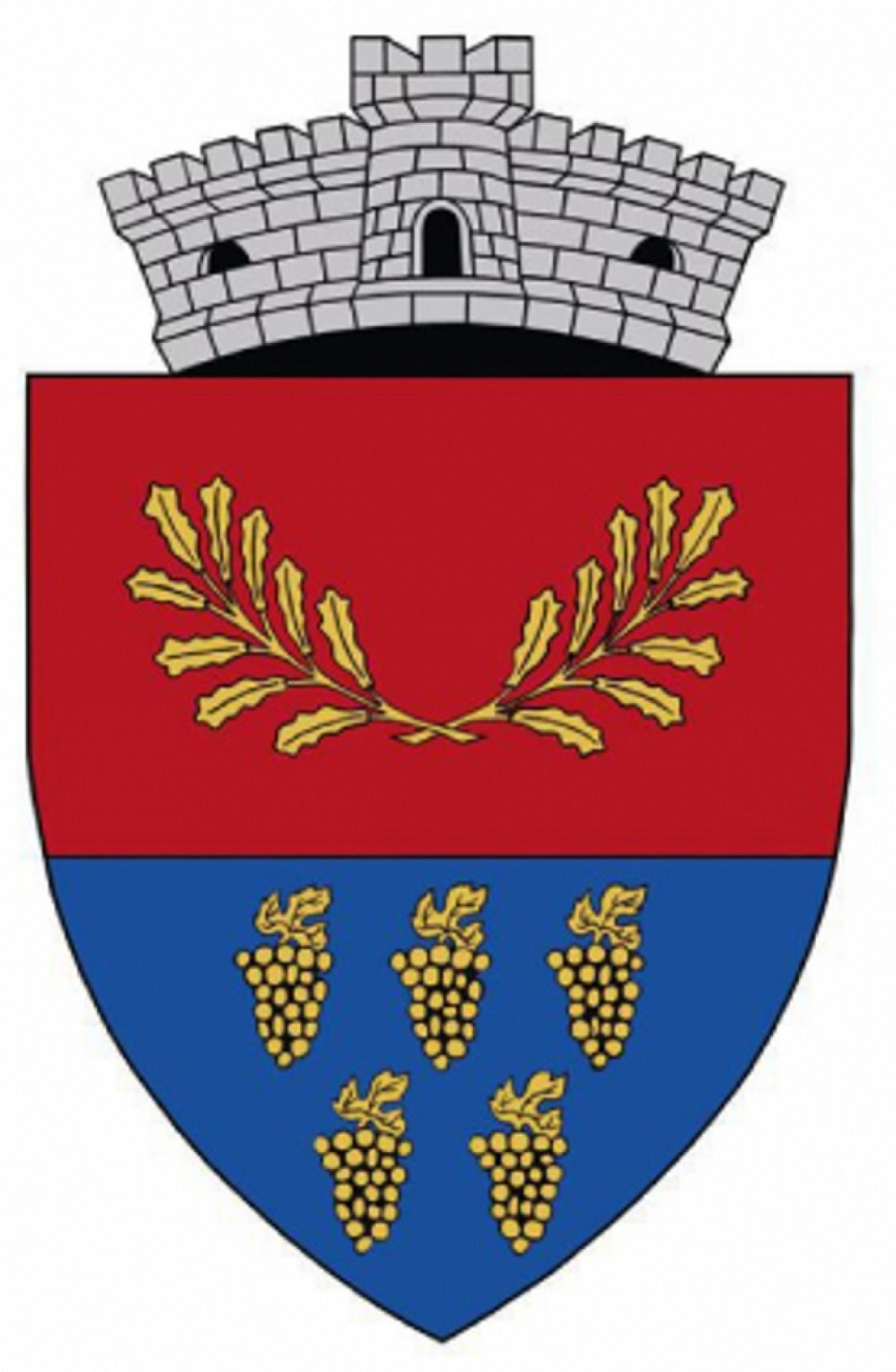
- Coat of arms

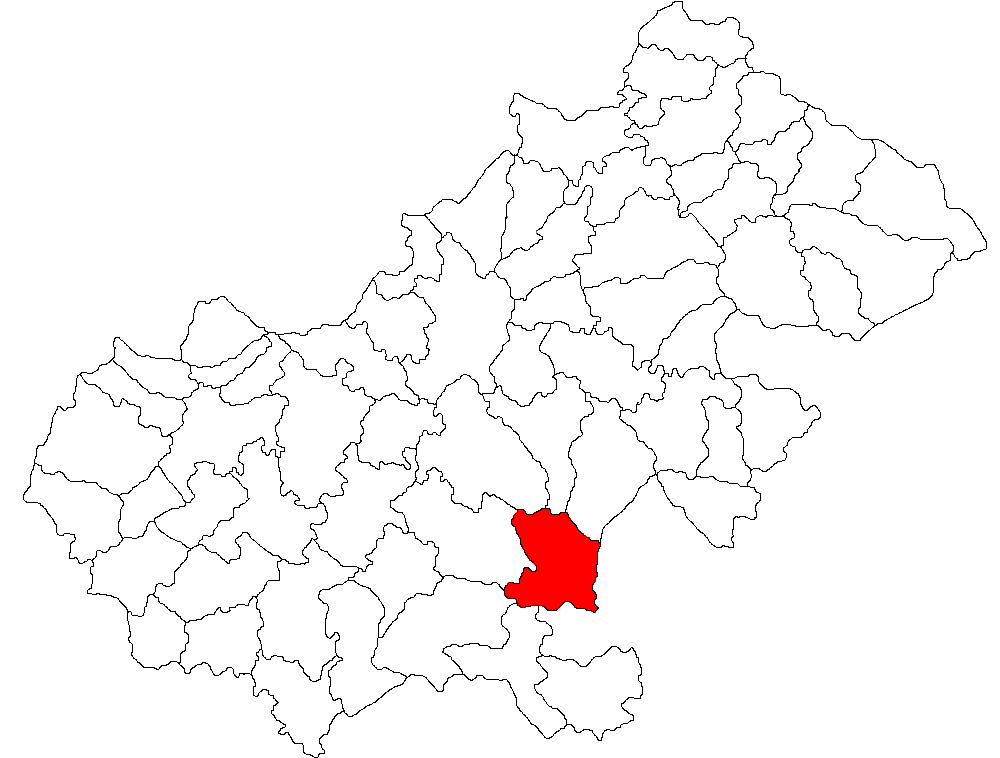
- Location in Satu Mare County

- Location in Romania
- Coordinates: 47°34′N 22°57′E
- Country: Romania
- County: Satu Mare

Government
  - Mayor (2020–2024): Mare Nicolae Cornea (PNL)
- Area: 88.76 km^{2} (34.27 sq mi)
- Elevation: 169 m (554 ft)
- Population (2021-12-01): 2,763
  - Density: 31.13/km^{2} (80.62/sq mi)
- Time zone: UTC+02:00 (EET)
  - Summer (DST): UTC+03:00 (EEST)
- Postal code: 447285
- Area code: (+40) 02 61
- Vehicle reg.: SM
- Website: www.primaria-socond.ro

Socond (Hungarian: Nagyszokond, Hungarian pronunciation: [nɒɟsokond]; German: Grossokond) is a commune situated in Satu Mare County, Romania. It is composed of five villages: Cuța (Laphegy), Hodișa (Béltekhodos), Socond, Soconzel (Kisszokond), and Stâna (Felsőboldád).

The commune is located in the southeastern part of the county, 34 km (21 mi) south of the county seat, Satu Mare, on the border with Maramureș County. Since 2013, it belongs to the Satu Mare metropolitan area.

At the 2021 census, Socond had a population of 2,763; of those, 50.74% were Roma and 39.81% Romanians.
