= Ardusat =

- Commune
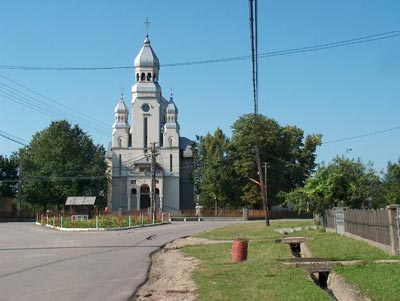
- Orthodox church in Ardusat

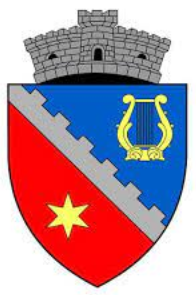
- Coat of arms

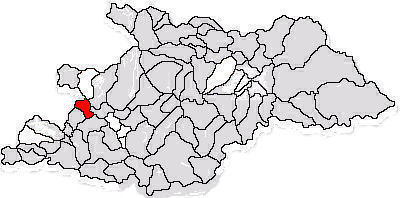
- Location in Maramureș County

- Location in Romania
- Coordinates: 47°38′59″N 23°21′44″E
- Country: Romania
- County: Maramureș

Government
  - Mayor (2020–2024): Vasile-Ciprian Rus (CMM)
- Area: 31.09 km^{2} (12.00 sq mi)
- Elevation: 170 m (560 ft)
- Population (2021-12-01): 2,551
  - Density: 82.05/km^{2} (212.5/sq mi)
- Time zone: UTC+02:00 (EET)
  - Summer (DST): UTC+03:00 (EEST)
- Postal code: 437005
- Area code: (+40) 02 62
- Vehicle reg.: MM
- Website: comuna-ardusat.ro

Ardusat (Hungarian: Erdőszáda) is a commune in western Maramureș County, Romania on the banks of the Someș River, near the border with Satu Mare County. The first record of its existence dates back to 1230. It is composed of three villages: Ardusat, Arieșu de Câmp (Mezőaranyos), and Colțirea (Kolcér).

Ethnographically it belongs to "Țara Codrului" (The Forest Land), with which it shares numerous cultural traditions. The local choir has won prizes at Italian, Eastern European, and American contests.

== Sights ==
In addition to the local crafts, superstitions, and folklore, other attractions for tourists include the Greek-Catholic church (18th century), the ruins of the Degenfeld Castle, and a 300-year-old sequoia tree. The remnants of the railroad bridge over the Someș, destroyed by the 1970 floods, can still be seen. The river has great fishing. Since 2005 Ardusat has had its own celebration, which takes place on the first Saturday and Sunday after August 15 (the Dormition of the Theotokos). The religious celebration of the church is scheduled every year on January 6. The church in the village center was Romanian Greek-Catholic until 1948, when the communist regime outlawed the denomination and transferred its properties to the Romanian Orthodox Church.

Historical population
Year	Pop.	±%
1880	1,809	—
1900	2,014	+11.3%
1910	2,088	+3.7%
1930	2,294	+9.9%
1956	2,728	+18.9%
1977	2,876	+5.4%
1992	2,464	−14.3%
2002	2,543	+3.2%
2011	2,738	+7.7%
2021	2,551	−6.8%
Source: Census data

== Sister cities ==
- Vernier, Switzerland is a sister town to Ardusat.
