= Ileanda =

- Commune
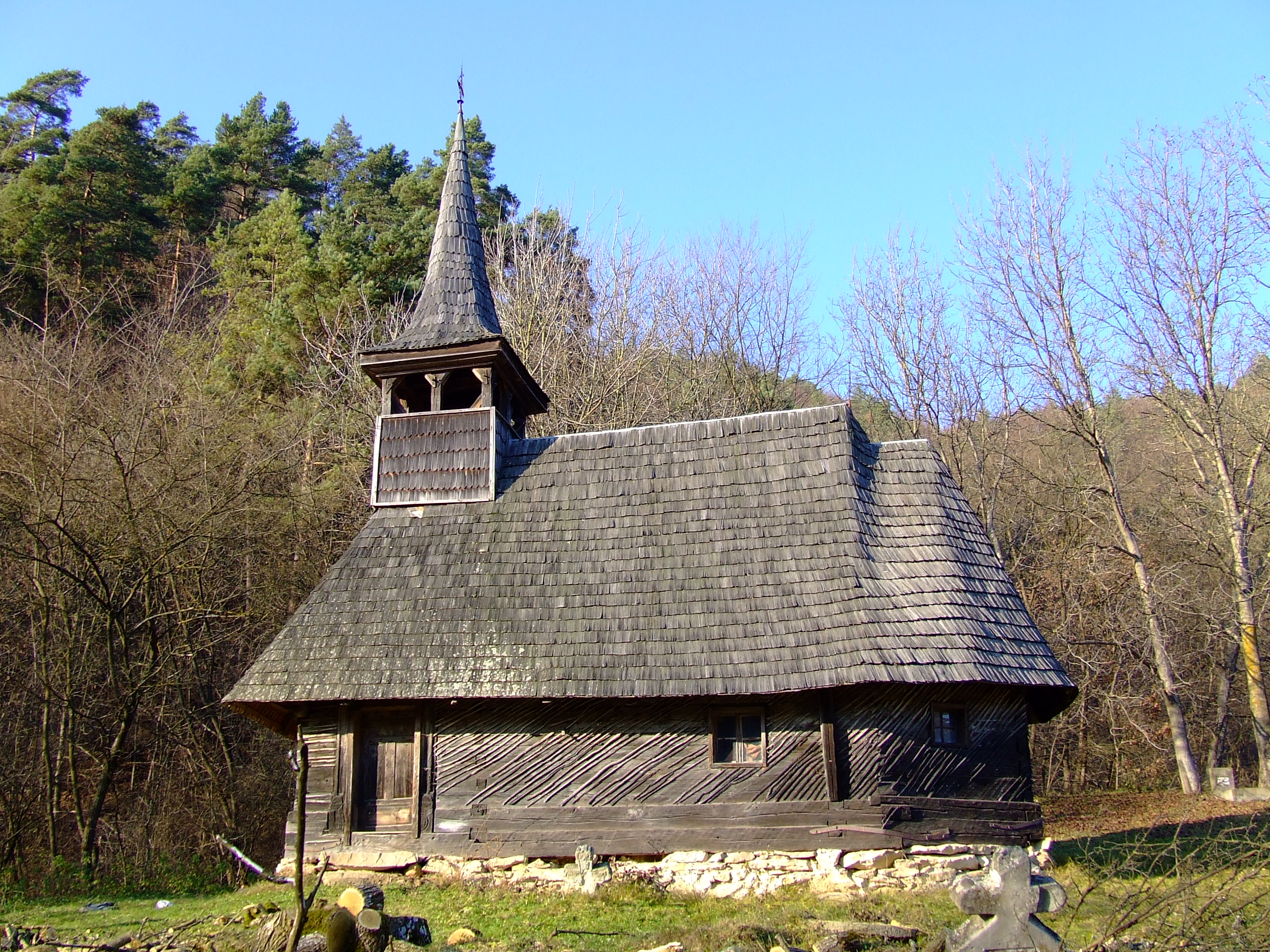
- Wooden church in Ileanda

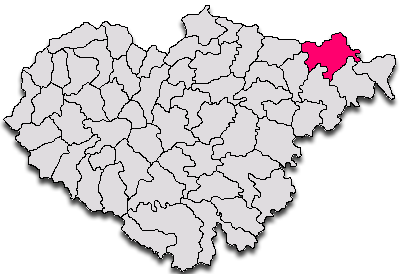
- Location in Sălaj County

- Location in Romania
- Coordinates: 47°19′39″N 23°36′58″E
- Country: Romania
- County: Sălaj

Government
  - Mayor (2020–2024): Dănuț-Ioan Pop (PNL)
- Area: 87.59 km^{2} (33.82 sq mi)
- Elevation: 239 m (784 ft)
- Population (2021-12-01): 2,066
  - Density: 23.59/km^{2} (61.09/sq mi)
- Time zone: UTC+02:00 (EET)
  - Summer (DST): UTC+03:00 (EEST)
- Postal code: 457190
- Area code: +(40) 0260
- Vehicle reg.: SJ
- Website: comunaileanda.ro

Ileanda (Hungarian: Nagyilonda) is a commune located in Sălaj County, Transylvania, Romania. It is composed of thirteen villages: Bizușa-Băi (Büdöspataka), Bârsăuța (Kisborszó), Dăbiceni (Kisdoboka), Dolheni (Ilondapatak), Ileanda, Luminișu (Szakadás), Măleni (Kisilonda), Negreni (Konkolyfalva), Perii Vadului (Révkörtvélyes), Podișu (Csömény), Răstoci (Hosszúrév), Rogna (Kornislaka), and Șasa (Sasfalu).

== History ==
Human settlement began in Dacian times.

In the 1830s, Jews began to arrive in Ileanda, and by the end of the century, the community ran nearly all commerce and small industry in the village and its surroundings. In the interwar period, there was a yeshiva with 30 to 40 students, while Zionist activity started in the 1920s. In 1930, there were 308 Jews or 26% of the population. In June 1942, 11 Jews were drafted into labor battalions in Reichskommissariat Ukraine, of whom two survived. In May 1944, 900 Jews were sent by the authorities of the Kingdom of Hungary to the Dej ghetto and then to the Auschwitz concentration camp. József Paneth, who became the local rabbi in 1926, escaped deportation to Romania with his family. Following World War II, he served the surviving Jews until the community dispersed in 1950.

== Sights ==
- Wooden Church in Ileanda, built in the 17th century, historic monument
- Wooden Church in Negreni, built in the 17th century, historic monument
- Wooden Church in Răstoci, built in the 19th century (1828), historic monument
- Wooden Church in Podișu, built in the 18th century, historic monument
- Forest “La Castani”, Natural reserve
- Măgurici Cave, Natural reserve

== Image gallery ==
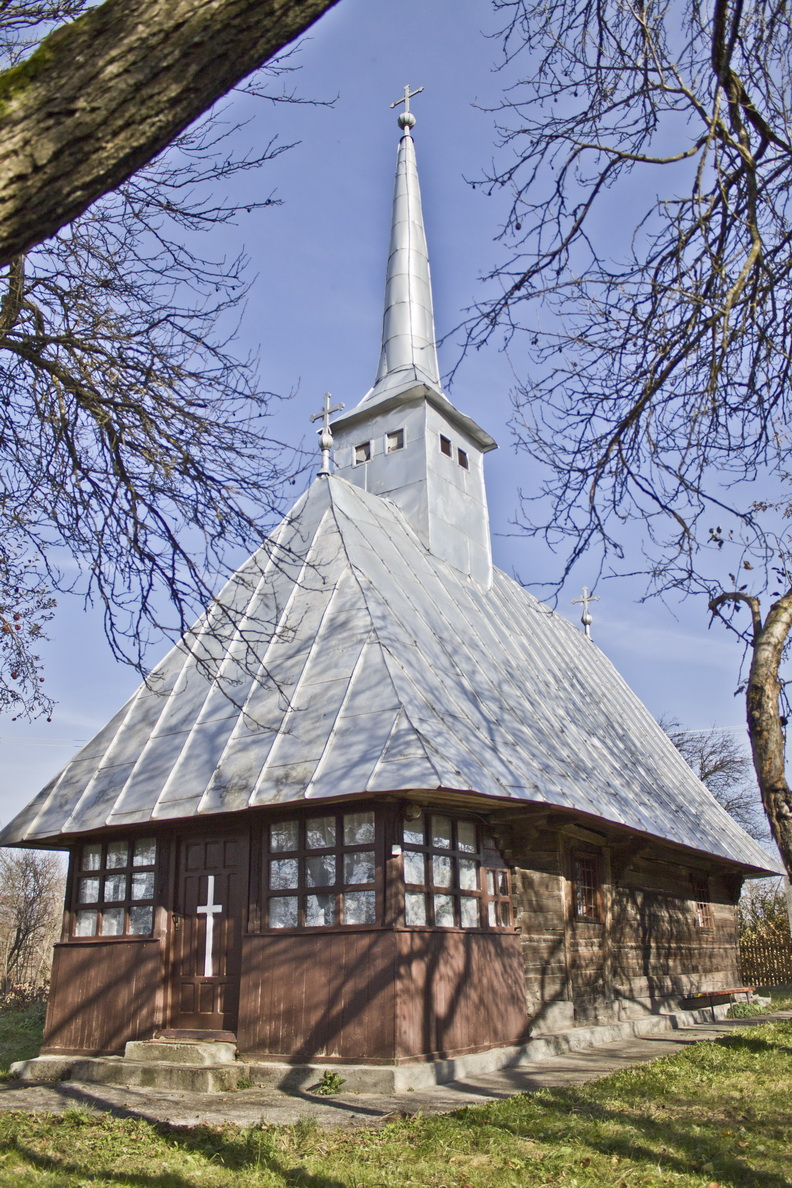
Wooden church in Negreni

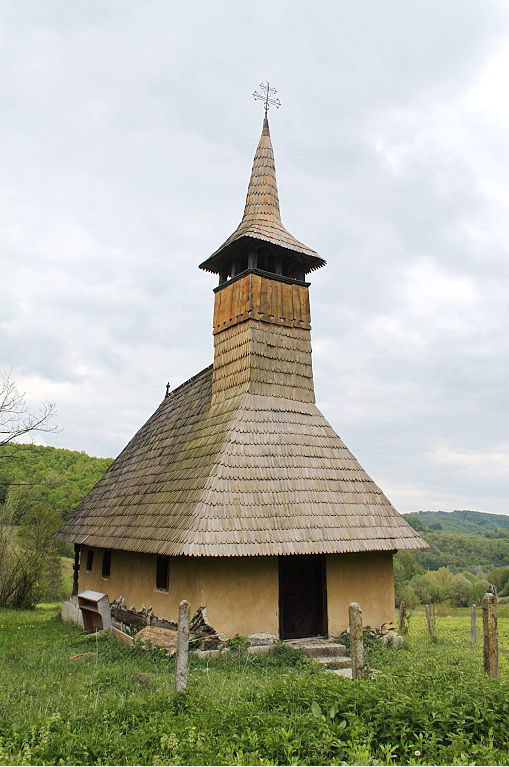
Wooden church in Măleni

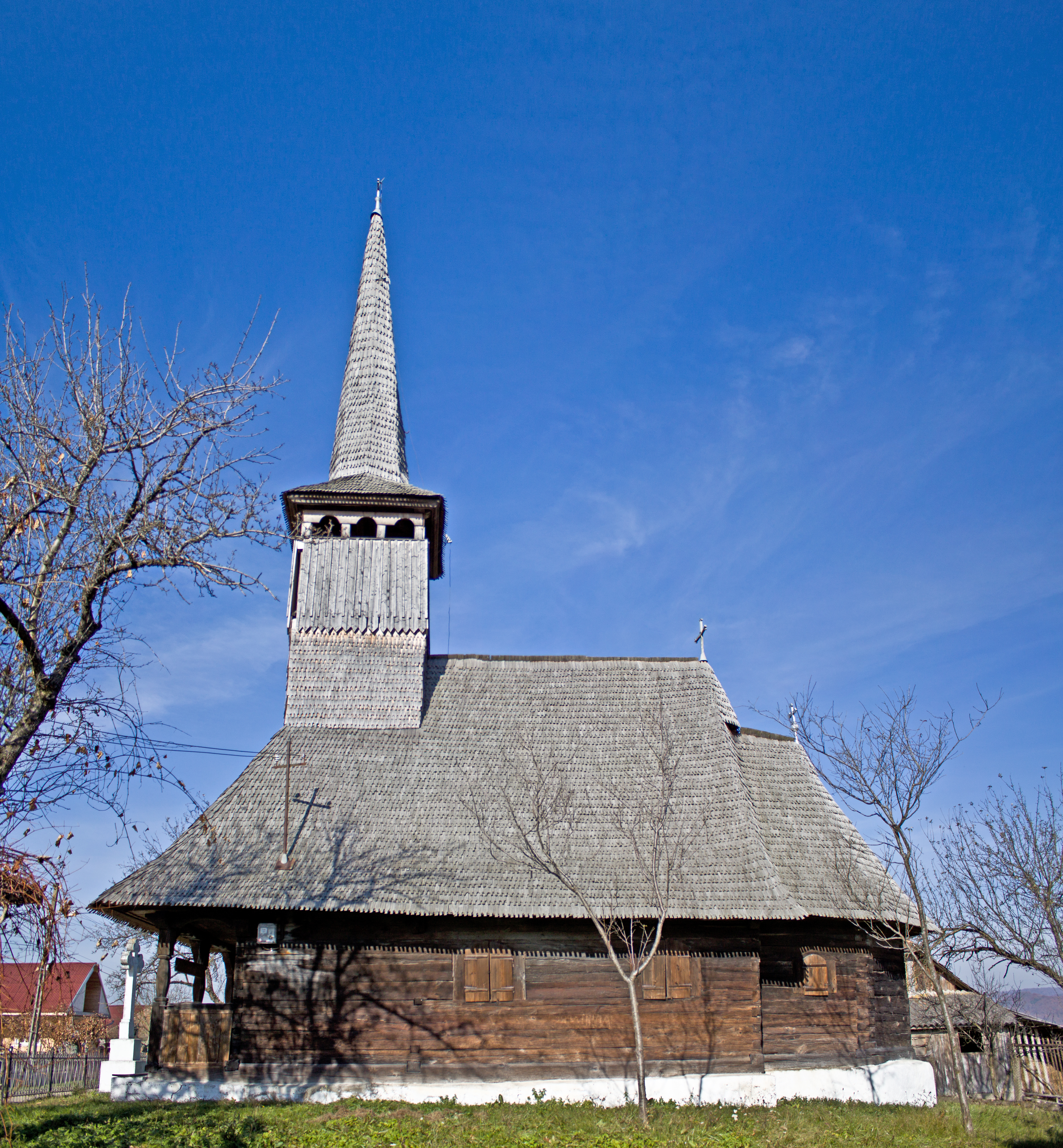
Wooden church in Podișu

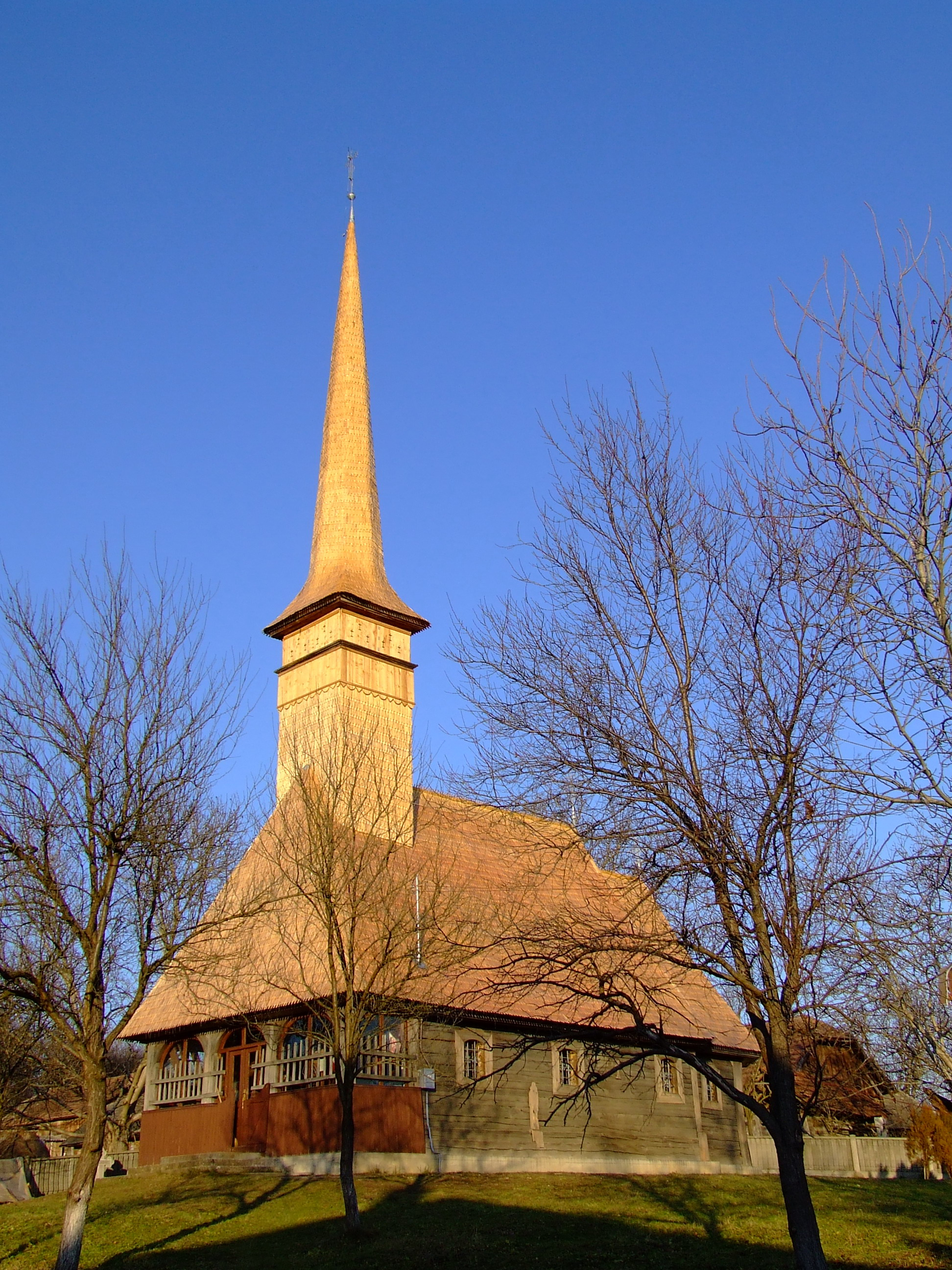
Wooden church in Răstoci
