= Bârsău =

- Commune
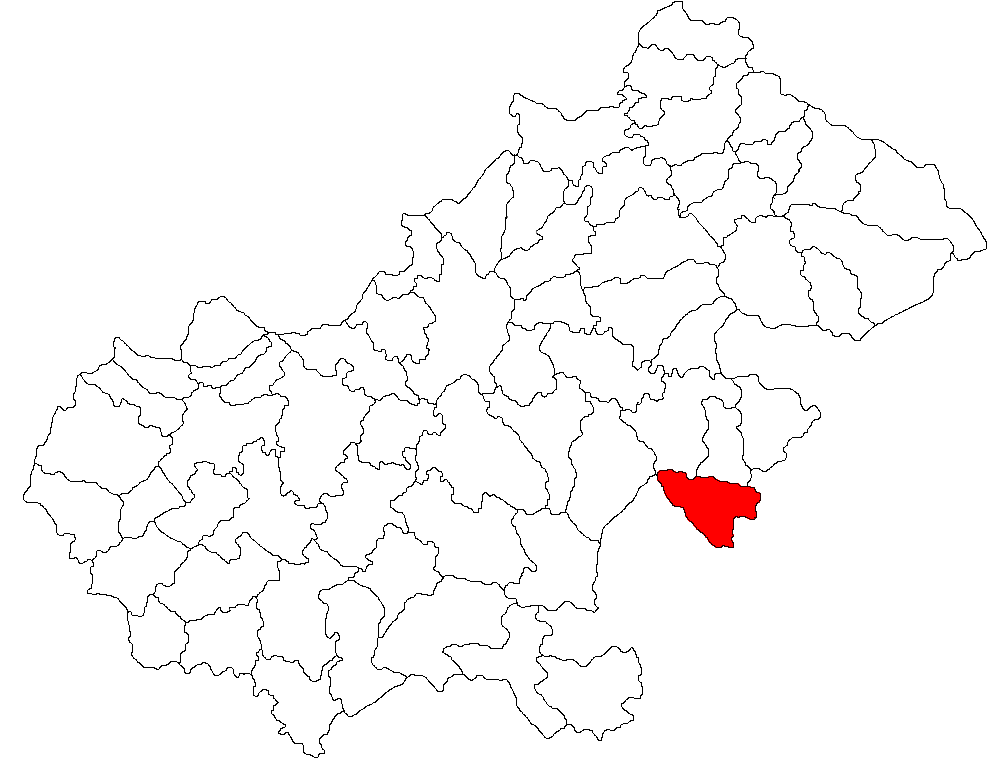
- Location in Satu Mare County

- Location in Romania
- Coordinates: 47°35′32″N 23°13′17″E
- Country: Romania
- County: Satu Mare
- Area: 52.16 km^{2} (20.14 sq mi)
- Population (2021-12-01): 2,199
  - Density: 42/km^{2} (110/sq mi)
- Time zone: EET/EEST (UTC+2/+3)
- Vehicle reg.: SM

Bârsău (Hungarian: Felsőberekszó; [fɛlʃøːbɛrɛksoː]) is a commune of 2,424 inhabitants situated in Satu Mare County, Romania. It is composed of two villages, Bârsău de Jos (Alsóberekszó; [ɒlʃoːbɛrɛksoː]) and Bârsău de Sus (the commune center).
