= Valea Vinului =

- Commune
- Location in Satu Mare County

- Location in Romania
- Coordinates: 47.7178°N 23.1878°E
- Country: Romania
- County: Satu Mare

Government
  - Mayor (2020–2024): Radu Cristea (PSD)
- Area: 88.36 km^{2} (34.12 sq mi)
- Elevation: 140 m (460 ft)
- Population (2021-12-01): 1,582
  - Density: 18/km^{2} (46/sq mi)
- Time zone: EET/EEST (UTC+2/+3)
- Postal code: 447345
- Vehicle reg.: SM
- Website: primariavaleavinului.ro

Valea Vinului (Hungarian: Szamosborhíd, Hungarian pronunciation: [ˈsɒmoʃborhiːd]) is a commune of 2,334 inhabitants situated in Satu Mare County, Romania. It is composed of four villages: Măriuș (Mogyorós), Roșiori (Szamosveresmart), Sâi (Szinfalu) and Valea Vinului.

The Măriuș Monastery is located in Măriuș village.
