= Doba, Satu Mare =

Doba Szamosdob
- Commune
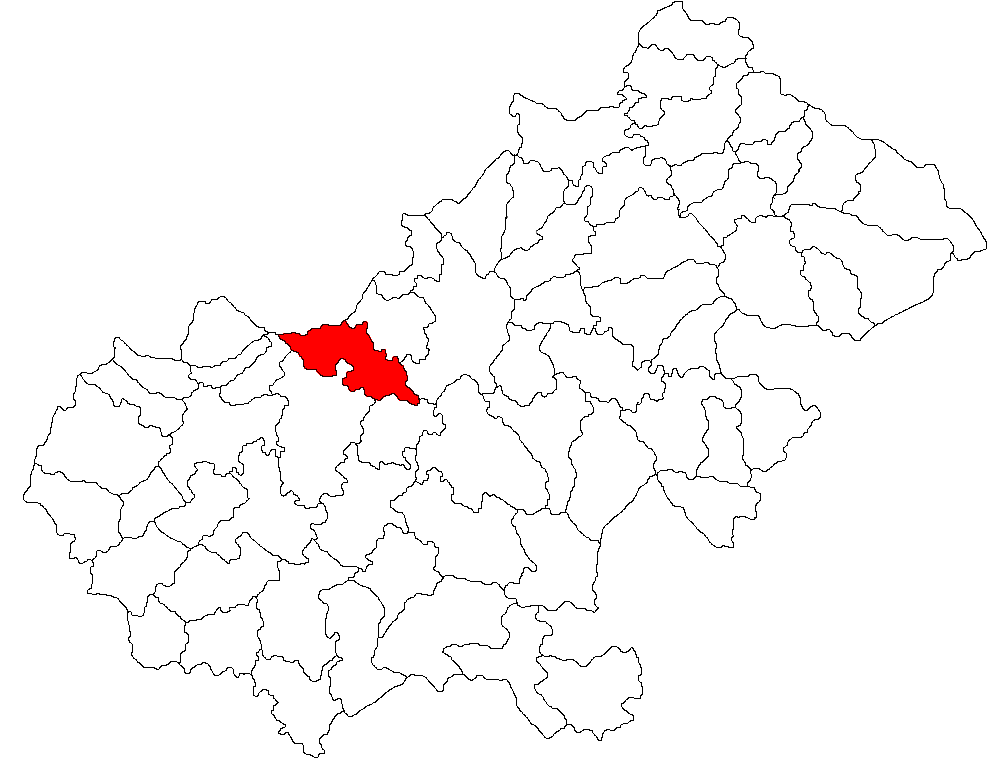
- Location in Satu Mare County

- Location in Romania
- Coordinates: 47°45′N 22°43′E
- Country: Romania
- County: Satu Mare
- Population (2021-12-01): 2,659
- Time zone: EET/EEST (UTC+2/+3)
- Vehicle reg.: SM

Doba (Hungarian: Szamosdob, pronounced: [sɒmoʃdob]) is a commune of 2,760 inhabitants (2011) situated in Satu Mare County, Romania. It is composed of five villages:

| In Romanian | In Hungarian |
|---|---|
| Boghiș | Csengerbagos |
| Dacia | Dácia |
| Doba | Szamosdob |
| Paulian | Sándormajor |
| Traian | Újbagos |

== Demographics ==
Ethnic groups (2011 census):

- Romanians: 61%
- Hungarians: 19%
- Roma: 13%
- Ukrainians: 4%

61% had Romanian as first language, 23% Hungarian, 9% Romani and 3% Ukrainian.
