= Culciu =

Culciu Nagykolcs
- Commune
- Location in Satu Mare County

- Location in Romania
- Coordinates: 47.7547°N 23.0608°E
- Country: Romania
- County: Satu Mare
- Population (2021-12-01): 3,712
- Time zone: EET/EEST (UTC+2/+3)
- Vehicle reg.: SM

Culciu (Hungarian: Nagykolcs, pronounced: [nɒɟkoltʃ]) is a commune of 3,751 inhabitants situated in Satu Mare County, Romania. Its center is Culciu Mare, and the commune is composed of six villages:

In Romanian	In Hungarian
Apateu	Dobrácsapáti
Cărășeu	Szamoskrassó
Corod	Szamoskóród
Culciu Mic	Kiskolcs
Culciu Mare	Nagykolcs
Lipău	Szamoslippó
