= Gâlgău =

- Commune
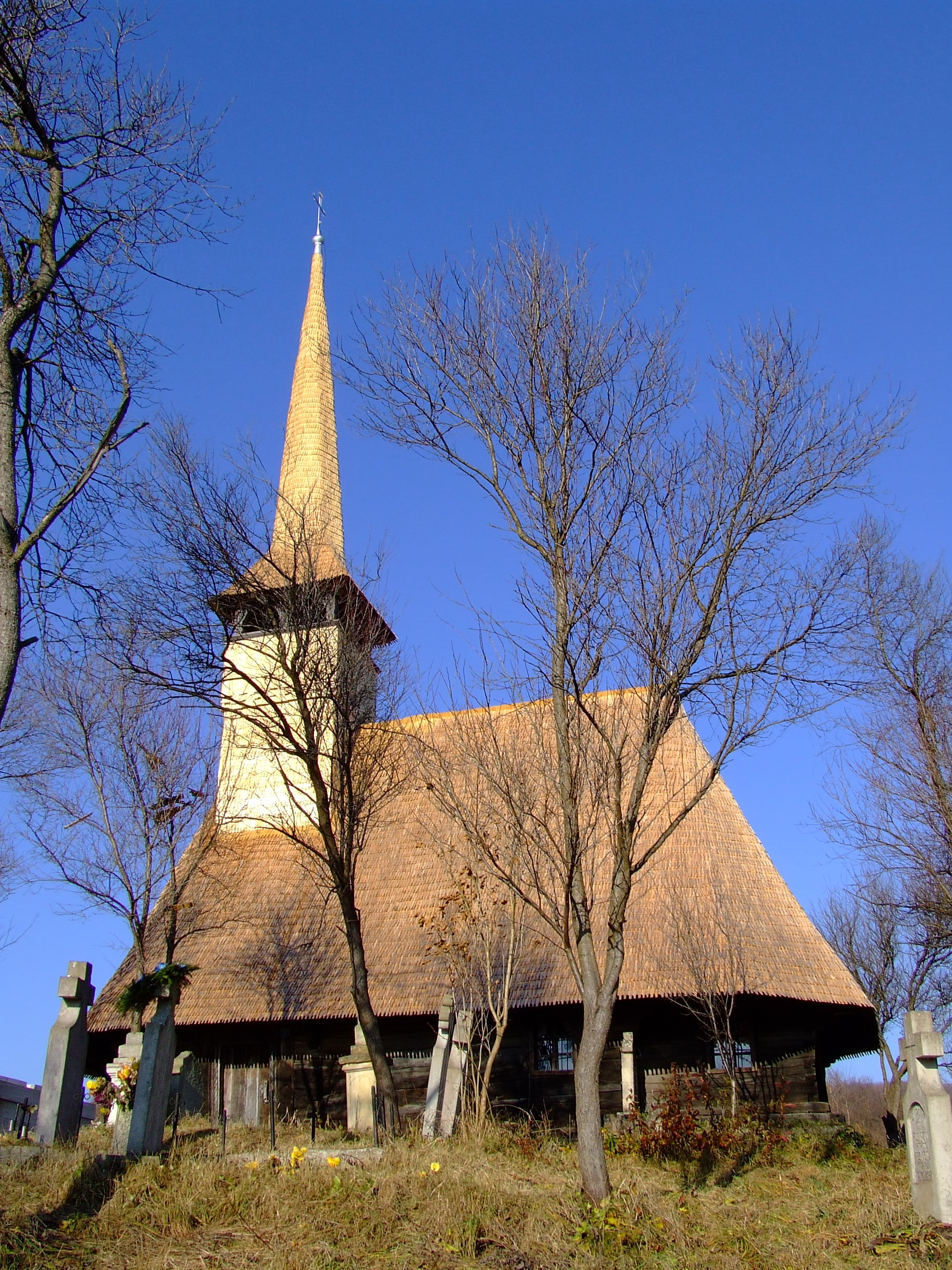
- Wooden Church in Bârsău Mare

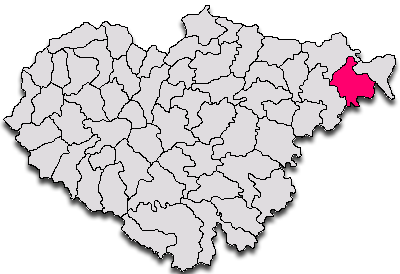
- Location in Sălaj County

- Location in Romania
- Coordinates: 47°16′54″N 23°42′11″E
- Country: Romania
- County: Sălaj

Government
  - Mayor (2020–2024): Cristian Ungur (PNL)
- Area: 75.31 km^{2} (29.08 sq mi)
- Elevation: 224 m (735 ft)
- Population (2021-12-01): 2,313
  - Density: 30.71/km^{2} (79.55/sq mi)
- Time zone: UTC+02:00 (EET)
  - Summer (DST): UTC+03:00 (EEST)
- Postal code: 457140
- Area code: +(40) 0260
- Vehicle reg.: SJ
- Website: primariagilgau.ro

Gâlgău (Hungarian: Galgó) is a commune located in Sălaj County, Transylvania, Romania. It is composed of nine villages: Bârsău Mare (Nagyborszó), Căpâlna (Csicsókápolna), Chizeni (Közfalu), Dobrocina (Döbörcsény), Fodora (Oláhfodorháza), Frâncenii de Piatră (Kőfrinkfalva), Gâlgău, Glod (Szamossósmező), and Gura Vlădesei (Vlegyászatanya).

At the 2011 census, the total population was 2,456; of those, 92.18% were Romanians and 3.66% Roma. At the 2021 census, Gâlgău had a population of 2,313, of which 87.59% were Romanians and 7.74% Roma.

== Sights ==
- Wooden church of Gâlgău (constructed in 1658)
- Wooden church of Bârsău Mare (constructed in 1690)
- Wooden church of Fodora (constructed in 1817)
