= Someș =

Someș/Szamos
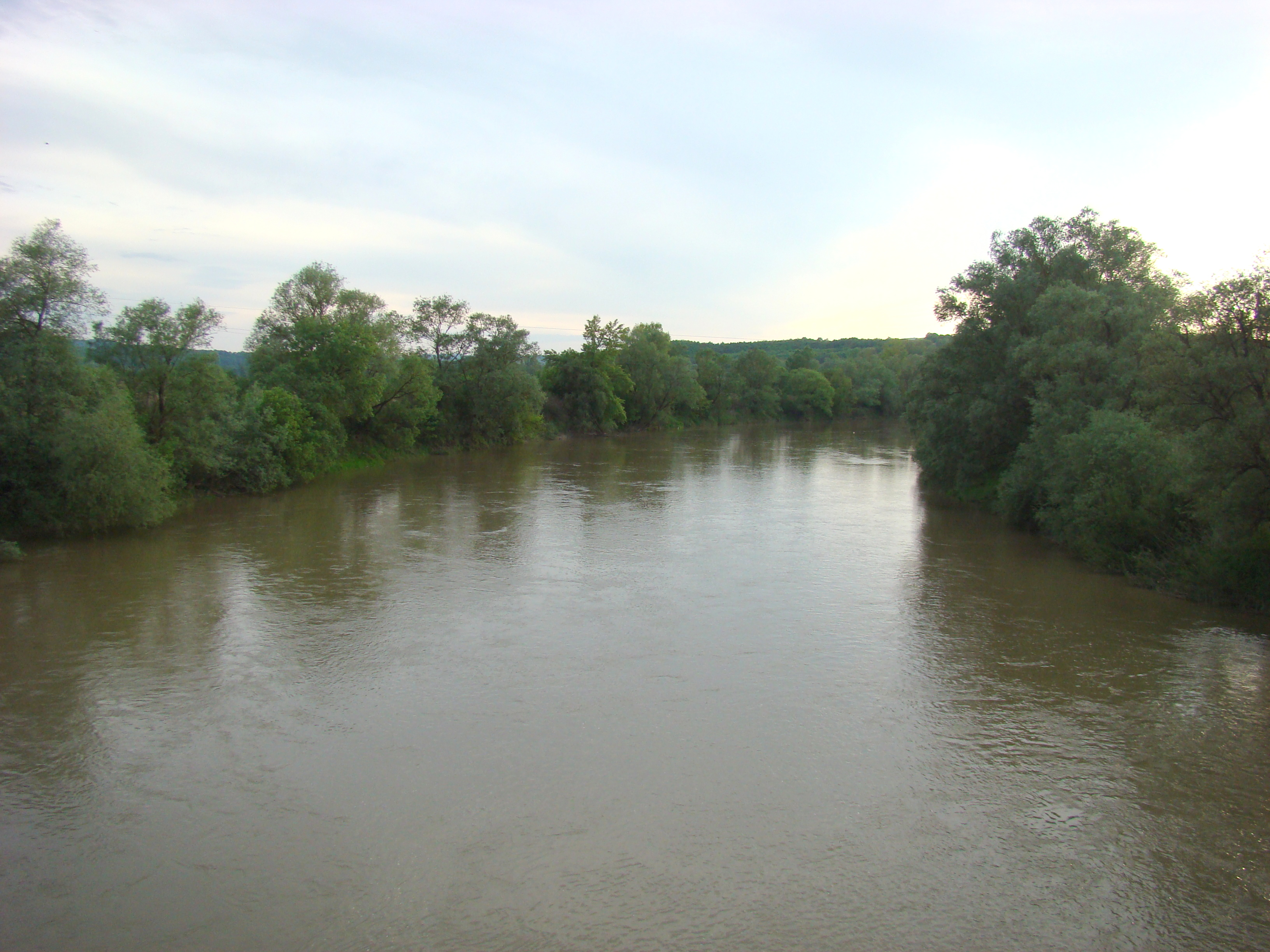
- The Someș at Letca, Sălaj County

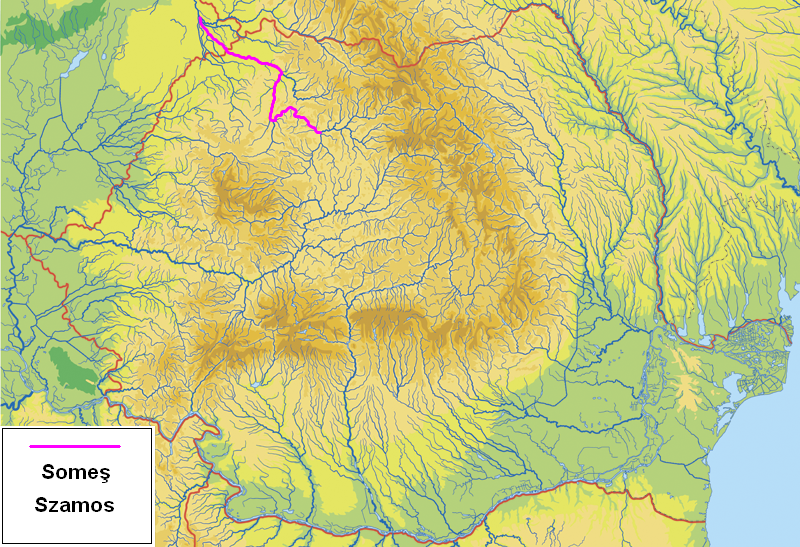
- The Someș marked in fuchsia color
- Etymology: According to one view: borrowed Hungarian (Szamos, archaically Zomus), perhaps directly from Slavic, from latin. The Hungarian name formed with Slavic mediation. In Roman times, the river was known as Samum (accusative). Its root may be in connection with the French river name Somme. A proposed Indo-European root, *s(w)om-isyo ('rich in catfish') is unlikely. The opposite view starts from the radical çam-, through Latin Samus, and by late substrate transition of stressed a to stressed o (like in Potaissa/Patavissa).

Location
- Countries: Romania; Hungary
- Cities: Dej; Jibou; Ulmeni; Satu Mare

Physical characteristics
- Source
  - location: Confluence of Someșul Mare and Someșul Mic
  - coordinates: 47°8′41″N 23°54′48″E
- Mouth
  - location: Tisza
  - coordinates: 48.1140°N 22.3394°E
  - elevation: 122 m (400 ft)
- Length: 415 km (258 mi)
- Basin size: 18,146 km^{2} (7,006 mi^{2}) 19,108.8 km^{2} (7,377.9 mi^{2})
- Discharge
  - location: Vásárosnamény, Hungary (near mouth)
  - average: 130 m^{3}/s (4,600 cu ft/s) 138.593 m^{3}/s (4,894.4 cu ft/s)

Basin features
- Progression: Tisza→ Danube→ Black Sea
- Tributaries
  - left: Someșul Mic, Sălaj
  - right: Someșul Mare, Lăpuș
- Waterbodies: 7

The Someș (Romanian pronunciation: [ˈsomeʃ]) or Szamos (German: Somesch or Samosch) is a left tributary of the Tisza in Hungary and Romania. It has a length of 415 km (258 mi) (including its source river Someșul Mare), of which 50 km are in Hungary. The Someș is the fifth largest river by length and volume in Romania. The hydrographic basin forms by the confluence at Mica, a commune about 4 km upstream of Dej, of Someșul Mare and Someșul Mic rivers. Someșul Mic (formed by the confluence of Someșul Rece with Someșul Cald) originates in the Apuseni Mountains, and Someșul Mare springs from the Rodna Mountains.

Someșul Mare has a length of 130 km and an area of 5,033 km^{2} and a slight asymmetry in favor of the left side of the basin. For the entire basin of Someș, the asymmetry on left becomes pronounced between Dej and Ardusat to change in the opposite direction after receiving the Lăpuș on the right side. The valley of Someșul Mare has much auriferous alluvium that, until the early 20th century, were brought to the surface using traditional tools. Specialists say that in the Someșul Mare were found grains of gold of 21 carats.

The Someș drains a basin of 18,146 km^{2} (7,006 sq mi), of which 15,740 km^{2} (6,080 sq mi) in Romania. Its basin comprises 403 rivers with a total length of 5,528 km, or 7% of the total length of the country. Basin area represents 6.6% of the country area and 71% of the area of Someș–Tisza hydrographic basin.

To prevent flooding, the Someș is dammed in the lower course. In the spring of 1970, due to heavy rains, the Someș flooded part of Satu Mare and surrounding plains. The discharge exceeded 3,300 m^{3}/s compared to that year's average of 210 m^{3}/s.

== Tributaries ==
The following rivers are tributaries to the river Someș:

- Left: Someșul Mic, Salca, Olpret, Vad, Șimișna, Iapa, Cormeniș, Valea Leșului, Lozna, Valea Hrăii, Solona, Brâglez, Almaș, Agrij, Apa Sărată, Șoimuș, Bârsa, Inău, Valea Urdii, Horoat, Uileac, Sălaj, Bortura, Runc, Rodina, Bicău, Valea Vinului, Lipău, Valea Morii, Homorodul Nou, Homorodul Vechi
- Right: Someșul Mare, Sălătruc, Muncel, Poiana, Vâtroape, Ileanda, Purcăreț, Cheud, Iadăra, Măriușa, Răchitișa, Bârsău, Arieș, Lăpuș, Nistru, Cicârlău, Ilba, Seinel
