= Reed trio =

Musical ensemble of three woodwind players

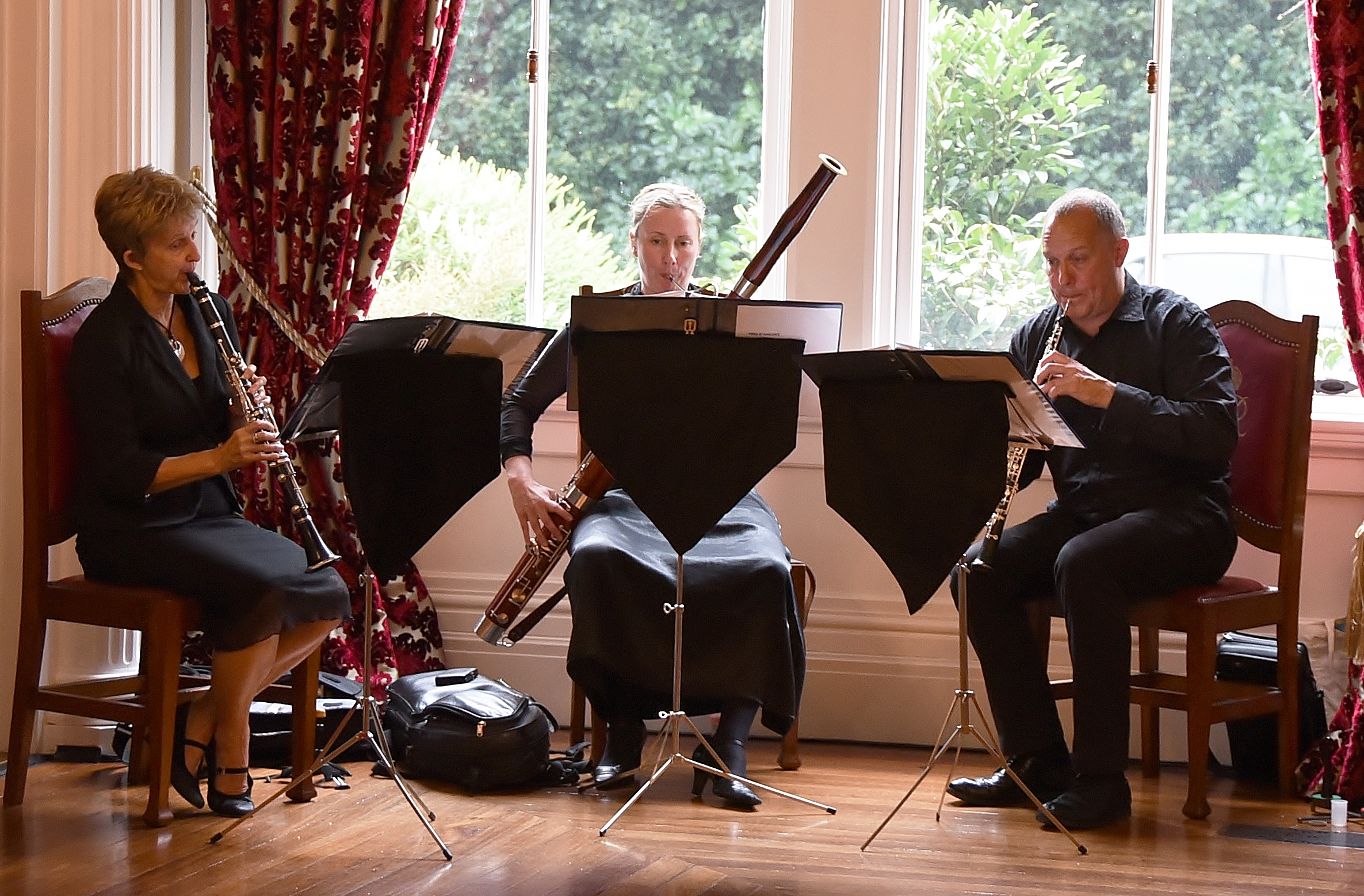
Wellington Trio d'Anches performing at Government House in 2018

A reed trio, also known as a trio d’anches, is a mixed chamber ensemble consisting of three reed instruments: oboe, clarinet and bassoon. Either term can also refer to a musical composition for this ensemble.

== History ==
The origins of the reed trio are more recent than the wind quintet: while the latter arose early in the nineteenth century, the first known composition for reed trio, a work by French composer Ange Flégier, was not written until 1897. The reed trio ranks second only to the wind quintet among woodwind chamber ensembles in terms of popularity and quantity of original repertoire. The reed trio genre became more firmly established in the late 1920s by bassoonist Fernand Oubradous, oboist Myrtile Morel and clarinetist Pierre Lefèbvre, who together comprised the Trio d’Anches de Paris. Much of the original repertoire for the reed trio was written for Oubradous’ ensemble as well as the contemporaneous Trio d’Anches René Daraux (René Daraux, oboe; Fernand Gossens, clarinet; Ange Maugendre, bassoon). Professional reed trios that have produced commercial recordings include the Saarland Radio Wind Trio, Ensemble Trielen, Trio Lézard, the Cavell Trio, Trio d’Anches de Cologne, Trio d’Anches Hamburg, Trois Bois, Trio d'Anches de Monte-Carlo, Zagreb Wind Trio and Ocotillo Winds.

== Oiseau-Lyre Wind Trios ==
Several French composers are responsible for contributing some of the first works for reed trio and have written standards that are part of the Oiseau-Lyre Wind Trio Collection. This collection consists of seven compositions by Darius Milhaud, Jacques Ibert, Georges Auric, and Henry Barraud. These works came as a response to the formation of the well-received Trio d’anches de Paris in the 1930s. Louise Hanson-Dyer collaborated with the Trio d'anches de Paris to publish and record the music with her company Éditions de l’Oiseau-Lyre.

== List of reed trios by country ==
=== Argentina ===
- Salvador Ranieri, Sonata Trío (1960)
- Juan María Solare, Anche (2002)
- Juan María Solare, Soundtrack for an Imaginary Cartoon (2025). Movements: Animated Animation, Whimsical Capers, Shenanigans, Unnoticed, as Planned, On the Sly, Home Office, Tongue in Cheek, A Hint of Longing, Lucky Wheel, High Spirits.

=== Belgium ===
- Jean Decadt, Trio (1950)
- René Defossez, Trio à anches (1946)
- Albert Delvaux, Trio (1948)
- Jacqueline Fontyn, Sept petites pièces (1954)
- Marinus De Jong, Trio, Op. 126 (1961)
- Victor Legley, Trio, Op. 11 (1942)
- René Maniet, Trio d'anches (1959), Trio d'anches No. 2 (1960), Concert d'anches (1964)
- Arthur Meulemans, Trio (1933)
- Arie Van de Moortel, Trio No. 1, Op. 3 (1939, rev. 1954), Divertimento No. 1 (1962), Divertimento No. 3 (1966)
- Willem Pelemans, Trio No. 2 (1941), Trio No. 3 (1960)
- Marcel Poot, Divertimento (1942), Ballade (1954)
- Norbert Rosseau, Trois jouets, Op. 53 (1954)

=== Brazil ===
- Maria Inês Guimarães, Primavera
- Heitor Villa-Lobos, Trio (1921)

=== Bulgaria ===
- Marin Goleminov, Trio (1966)
- Bojan Ikonomow, Trio en mi, Op. 14 (1937)

=== Canada ===
- Violet Archer, Divertimento (1949)
- Bill Douglas, Trio (2007)
- Sophie Carmen Eckhardt-Gramatté, Wind Trio I, E115 (1968)
- Jacques Hétu, Four Miniatures (1987)
- David L. Kaplan, Three Sketches (1955)
- Blago Simeonov, Max and Moritz (1964)
- León Zuckert, Reminiscences Argentinas: Suite para trio de viento (1981)

=== Croatia ===
- Bruno Bjelinski, Gumpis Trio
- Srđan Dedić, Šumatina
- Krešimir Fribec, Miniature
- Fran Lhotka, Trio
- Ivo Maček, Trio (1994)
- Rudolf Matz, Trio
- Boris Papandopulo, Mala Suita (1949)
- Vlado Špoljarić, Chaconne (1971)

=== Czech Republic/Slovakia ===
- Vítězslava Kaprálová, Trio (1938, incomplete)
- Iša Krejčí, Trio-Divertimento (1935)
- Jiří Laburda, Trio
- Bohuslav Martinů, Quatre Madrigaux, H. 266 (1937)
- Erwin Schulhoff, Divertissement (1927)

=== Denmark ===
- Gunnar Berg, Trio d'anches (1955)
- Mogens Winkel Holm, Note-Book (1983)

=== France ===
- Arthur Aharonian, Trio d'anches (1989)
- Gabriel Allier, Scène champêtre (1920)
- Claude Arrieu, Trio d’anches (1936), Trio in C (1948)
- Chantal Auber, Contraste (1994)
- Georges Auric, Trio (1938)
- Claude Ballif, Trio, Op. 8 (1952)
- Roger Boutry, Divertissement
- Eugène Bozza, Suite brève en trio (1947)
- Pierre de Bréville, Trio d’anches
- Joseph Canteloube, Rustiques (1946)
- Marius Constant, Trio (1950)
- Jean-Yves Daniel-Lesur, Suite (1939)
- Fernande Decruck, Capriccio (1933), Variations en trio sur l’air de P’tit Quinquin (1935), Orientales (1943), Variations sur un air pyrénéen (1945), Pavane (1949), Sonata en Trio (1949), Trio classique
- Désiré Dondeyne, Suite d'airs populaires (1962)
- Pierre-Max Dubois, Trio d'anches (1958)
- Louis Durey, Divertissement, Op. 107
- Maurice Faillenot, Suite brève
- Georges Favre, Gouaches-Suite (1957)
- Pierre-Octave Ferroud, Trio in E Major (1933)
- Ange Flégier, Trio (1897)
- Félicien Forêt, Suite en trio (1953)
- Jean Françaix, Divertissement
- Maurice Franck, Trio d’anches (1937); Deuxième Trio d’anches (1960)
- Noël Gallon, Suite en Trio
- Ida Gotkovsky, Trio d’anches (1954)
- Émile Goué, Three Pieces (1937)
- Reynaldo Hahn, Églogue (1937)
- Charles Huguenin, Trio No. 1, Op. 30 (c1905); Trio No. 2, Op. 31
- Jacques Ibert, Cinq pièces en trio (1935)
- Denis Joly, Trio (1972)
- Manfred Kelkel, Divertimento (1958)
- Charles Koechlin, Trio, Op. 206] (1945)
- Marcel Labey, Suite pour trio d'anches, Op. 47
- Aubert Lemeland, Canzoni di Asolo, Op. 100
- Raymond Loucheur, Portraits
- Henri Martelli, Trio d'anches
- Jean Martinon, Sonatine No. 4 pour trio d’anches, Op. 26, No. 1 (194)
- Georges Migot, Thrène (1946), Trio d'anches (1946)
- Marcel Mihalovici, Trio, Op. 71 (1955)
- Darius Milhaud, Pastorale, Op. 147 (1935), Suite d'après Corrette, Op. 161b (1937)
- Paul Pierné, Bucolique variée (1947)
- Jean Rivier, Petite Suite (1946)
- Guy Ropartz, Entrata e Scherzetto (1947)
- Albert Roussel, Andante d'un trio d'anches inacheve (1937)
- Jeanine Rueff, Trois pièces (1960)
- Henri Sauguet, Trio (1946)
- Patrice Sciortino, Haclaba
- Alexandre Tansman, Suite pour trio d’anches (1954)
- Henri Tomasi, Concert champêtre
- Jacques Vallier, Trio d'anches
- Marc Vaubourgoin, Trio (1927)
- Alain Weber, Trio (1959)

=== Germany ===
- Victor Bruns, Trio, Op. 49 (1979)
- Harald Genzmer, Trio (1994)
- Paul Höffer, Kleine Suite (1944), Thema mit Variationen (1944)
- Bertold Hummel, Noël: Little Christmas Suite, Op. 87e

=== Hungary ===
- Iván Erőd, Bläsertrio, Op. 4
- Ferenc Farkas, Maskarade: Commedia dell'arte (1986)
- Miklós Kocsár, Divertimento
- Rudolf Maros, Serenade
- Erzsébet Szőnyi, Five Old Dances (1969)

=== Israel ===
- Lior Navok, Jongleurs (2024)

=== Italy ===
- Fulvio Caldini, Guillaume, Op. 10 (1983)

=== Japan ===
- Sadao Bekku, Trio d’anches (1953)
- Maki Ishii, Black Intention II
- Jiro Mikami, Autumn Prelude in E minor
- Makoto Shinohara, Trio d'anches (1956)

=== Lithuania ===
- Vidmantas Bartulis, To Yesterday (1981)
- Martynas Bialobžeskis, Meditatonic (1996)
- Jonas Paulikas, From the Stories of Winnie-the-Pooh (1983)

=== Luxembourg ===
- Edmond Cigrang, Trio d'anches, Op. 5 (1953)
- Claus Krumlovsky, Trio d'anches (1974)

=== Macedonia ===
- Toma Prošev, Četiri eseja

=== Netherlands ===
- Henk Badings, Trio No. 2
- Rudolf Escher, Trio d’anches (1949)
- Jaap Geraedts, Divertimento No. 1 (1943), Divertimento No. 2 (1946)
- Jan Koetsier, 6 Bagatelles

=== Norway ===
- Edvard Hagerup Bull, Trois bucoliques, Op. 14 (1953)
- Trygve Madsen, Serenata Monellesca, Op. 26

=== Poland ===
- Andrzej Dobrowolski, Trio (1956)
- Benedykt Konowalski, Mini-Rondo (1973)
- Simon Laks, Concertino pour trio d’anches (1966)
- Witold Lutosławski, Trio (1945)
- Michał Spisak, Sonatina (1946)
- Antoni Szałowski, Trio (1936), Divertimento (1956)
- Wladyslaw Walentynowicz, Trio for Reeds (1981)

=== Romania ===
- Maya Badian, Trio (1981)
- Dumitru Bughici, Fantezie ritmică, op. 30 (1968)
- Liviu Comes, Trio for oboe, clarinet et bassoon (1987)
- Dora Cojocaru, Trio (1983)
- Liviu Dănceanu, Ossia, op. 10 (1982)
- Dan Dediu, Rondo alla Munchausen (2013)
- Violeta Dinescu, Trio d'anches (1982)
- Felicia Donceanu, Trio-divertisment (1978), Diptic (1989)
- Anton Dogaru, 12 invențiuni pentru trio (1987)
- Stan Golestan, Petite suite bucolique (1953)
- Dinu Lipatti, Trei Sonate de Scarlatti (1943)
- Mihail Andreescu Skeletty, Trio (1957)
- Gheorghe Stănescu, Trio, (1980)
- Hans Peter Turk, Trio nr. 1 (1964), Trio nr. 2 (1981)
- Paul Urmuzescu, Eseuri muzicale pentru oboi, clarinet și fagot
- Filip Vasile, Divertisment (1975)
- Marina Vlad, raze de lumină (1988)
- Lucian Vlădescu, Coral cu variațiuni sau miniaturi (1988)
- Adalbert Winkler, Preludiu și fugă (1988)

=== Russia ===
- Mikhail Ippolitov-Ivanov, Two Kirghiz Songs (1931)
- Dmitri Melkikh, Trio, Op. 17 (1926)
- Tatiana Smirnova, Tercet, Op. 59, No. 4 (1984)

=== Sweden ===
- Karl-Birger Blomdahl, Trio (1938)
- Hilding Rosenberg, Trio, Op. 42 (1927)

=== Switzerland ===
- Paul Juon, Arabesken, Op. 73 (1940)
- Sándor Veress, Sonatina (1933)
- Julien-François Zbinden, Trio d'anches, Op. 12 (1949)

=== United Kingdom ===
- Mary Chandler, Divertimento (1956), Trio (1967)
- Gordon Jacob, Trio
- Patric Standford, Cartoons (1984)

=== United States ===
- Jenni Brandon, The Sequoia Trio, Spider Trio, Found Objects: On the Beach, L’Étoile du Nord
- James Chaudoir, Sept Vignettes (1996)
- Kirke Mechem, Trio, Op. 8 (1959)
- Stephen Halloran, Reed Trio, Op. 23 (1995)
- Steven Rydberg, Three Quicksteps (1984)
- Greg Simon, Devil Winds (2014)

== Reed trio with accompanying instruments ==
=== Reed trio with orchestra ===
- Henri Tomasi, Divertimento Corsica for reed trio, strings and harp (1952)

=== Reed trio with piano ===
- Lukáš Hurník, Fusion Music
- Florent Schmitt, À tour d’anches, Op. 97 (1943)
- Patric Standford, Suite Humoresque (1987)
- Germaine Tailleferre, Sonata champêtre (1972), Menuet en fa (1979)

=== Reed trio with electronics ===
- Dai Fujikura, Phantom Splinter (2009)
