= Cuprom =

- Company type: Private
- Industry: Copper
- Founded: 2003
- Headquarters: Bucharest, Romania
- Key people: Horia Pitulea, CEO; Horia Simu, CEO; Mircea Stroe, CEO
- Products: Copper products, Copper wires, Copper bars
- Revenue: US$380 million (2007)
- Number of employees: 700 (2006)
- Website: www.cuprom.ro

Cuprom is the sole producer of electrolytic copper, continuous cast copper rod and enameled wire in Romania and the largest in Eastern Europe (outside Russia).

Cuprom's refinery in Baia Mare has an annual production capacity of 40,000 tones of cathodes. The company's plant in Zalău, using Contirod technology, is one of the leading European wire rod producers with an annual production capacity of 70,000 tonnes of copper rod. It also produces drawn, enameled and stranded (bunched) wires.

== Divisions ==
=== Cuprom Baia Mare ===
Cuprom Baia Mare was set up in the year 1907 in Ferneziu, near Baia Mare, as a private company producing sulfuric acid. It is recognised as a unique producer in Romania of electrolytically-refined copper (99.99% Cu), having a production capacity of 40,000 tones/year and of fine gold and silver respectively (min. 99.96% Au/Ag), having a production capacity of 12 tonnes/year for gold, respectively 120 tonnes/year for silver.

=== Cuprom Zalău ===
In Romania, Cuprom Zalău is the sole producer of continuous cast copper wire with an annual nominal production of 73,000 tones/year.

== Ownership ==
Most of the Romanian copper industry was in a state of collapse when in 2003 a group of Romanian investors, two bankers (Horia Pitulea and Horia Simu) and a lawyer (Mircea Stroe), decided to buy everything.

They formed Cuprom (Romanian copper) and with this company they bought Phoenix Baia Mare and Elcond Zalău for a meager US$3.6 million .

The company also wants to buy two Romanian copper mines to have the raw material for the copper smelters, and there are talks with the Romanian government for two mines and an investment plan of US$370 million for both of them.

== Controversy ==
In 2006 Cuprom won the bid for Serbian company RTB Bor with a total price of US$400 million and certain investments of US$150 million but due to Cuprom's inability to pay the asking price of US$400 million for RTB Bor, the Serbian government annexed the privatization. In November 2007, RTB Bor was sold to Austrian A-TEC for an even greater price of US$466 million, with a further US$273 million in investments, who in the end could not pay the price as well.

In 2013, Daniel Boldor began selling thousands of tons of mining sludge from the then-defunct Cuprom facility in Baia Mare to international metal traders, claiming it was "gold [or copper] concentrate." After several clients claimed their shipments were worthless and that laboratory certificates had been forged, the public prosecutor's office in Constanța filed an indictment against Boldor in June 2018 on charges of money laundering, customs fraud, document forgery, improper collection and transport of hazardous waste, and tax evasion.
