= Baia Mare =

City and county seat of Maramureș County, Romania

- County seat and Municipality
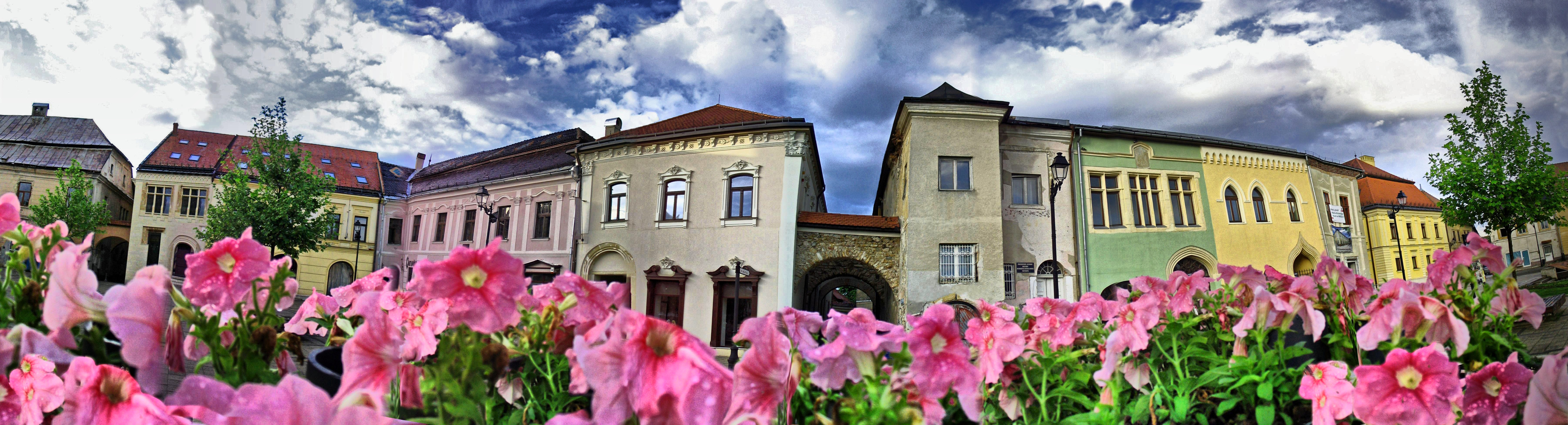
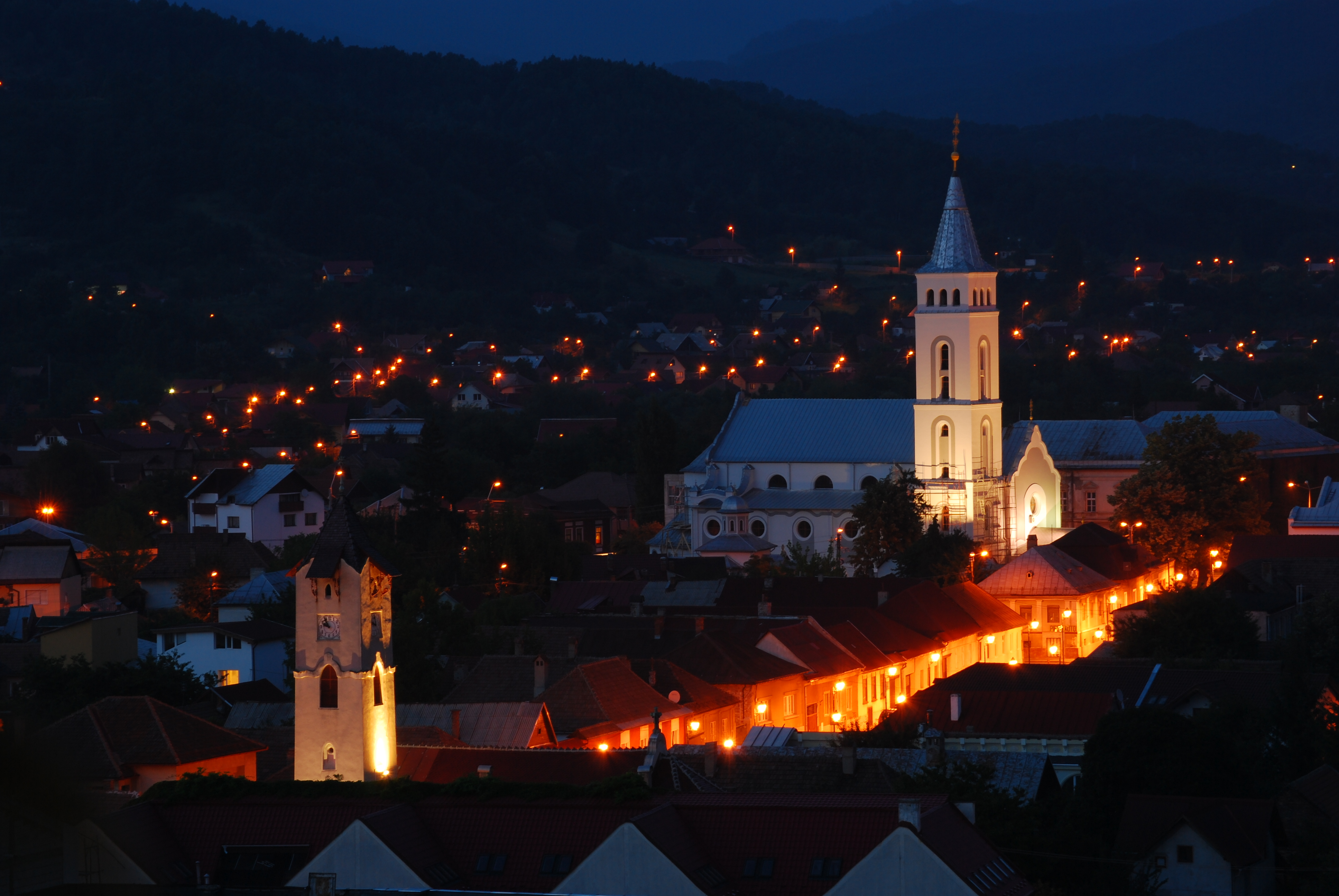
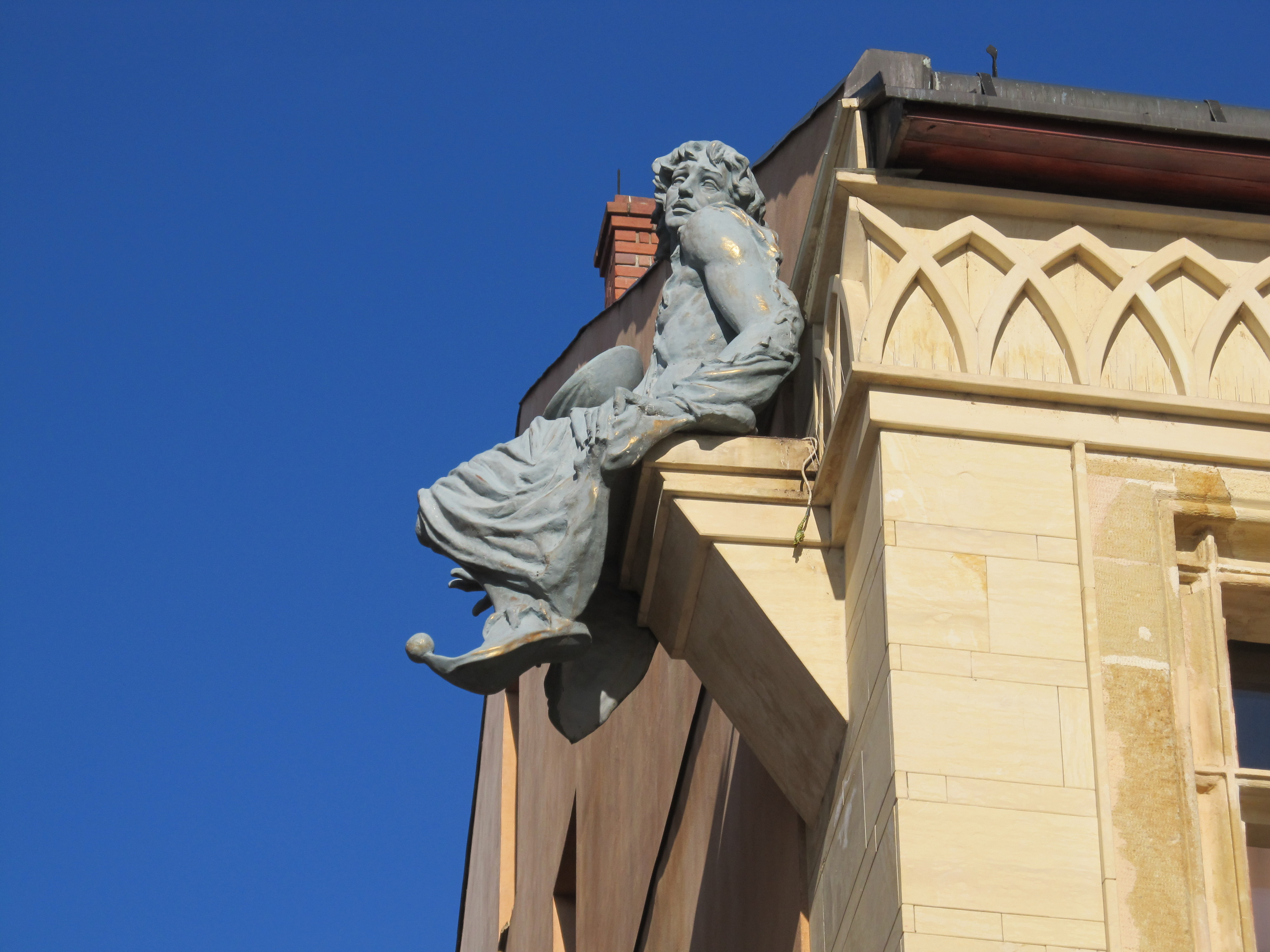
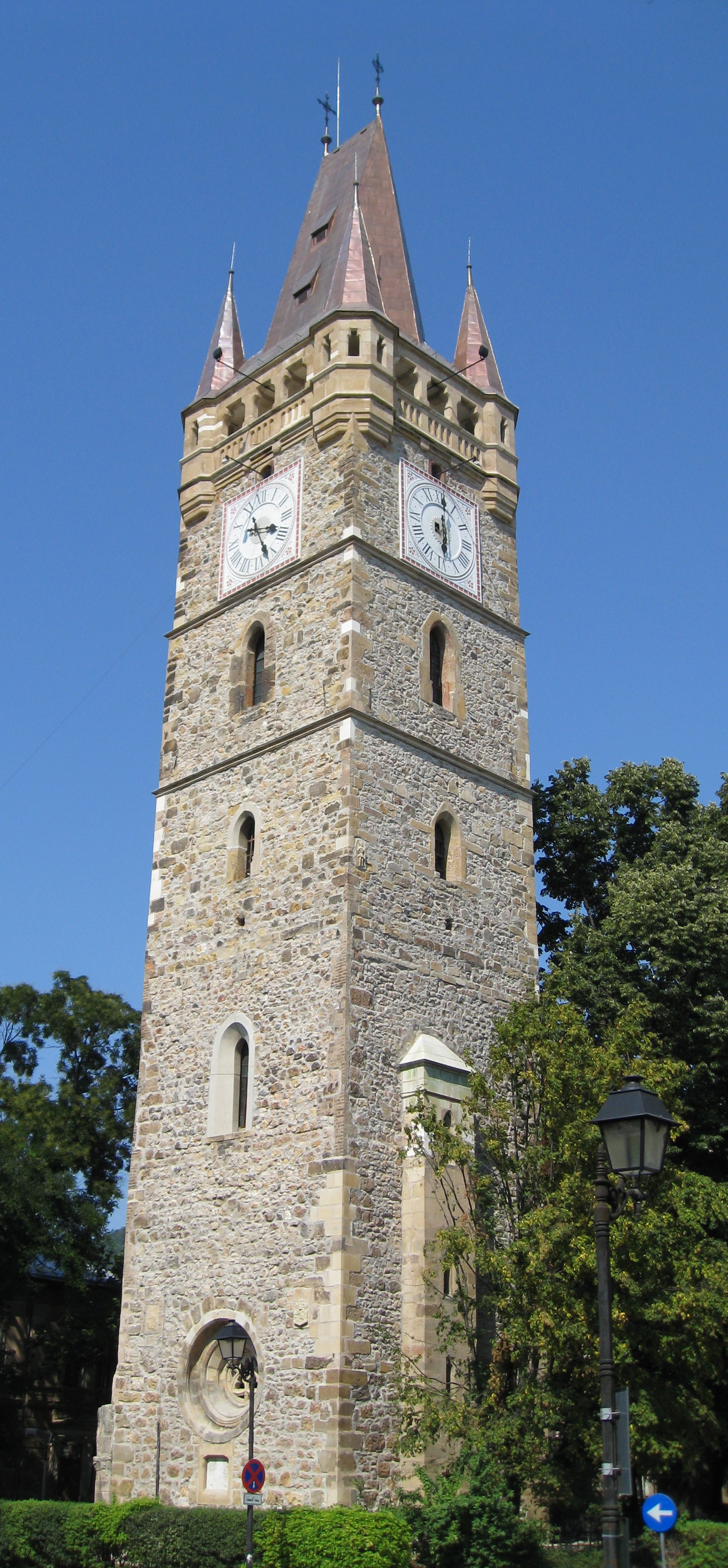
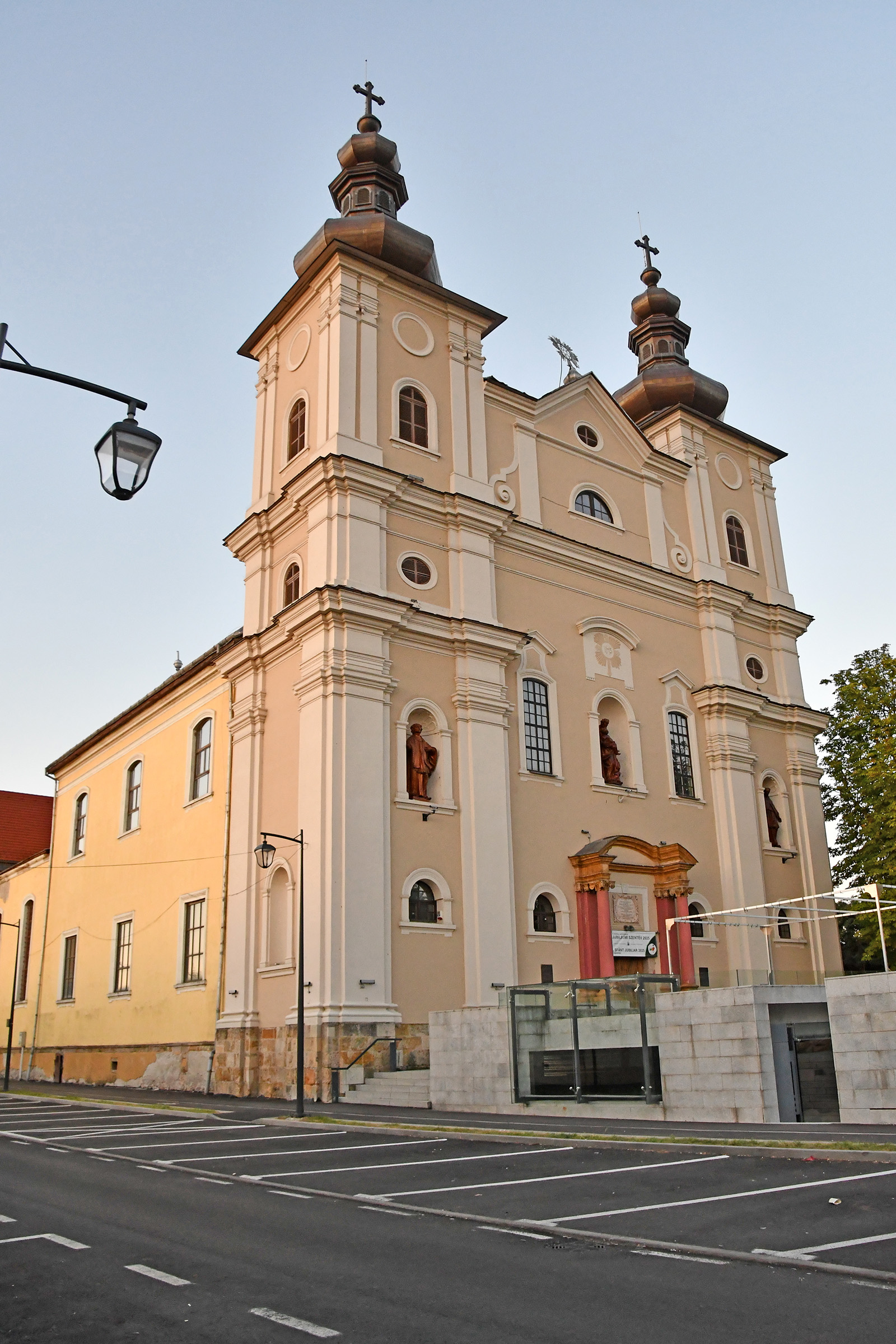
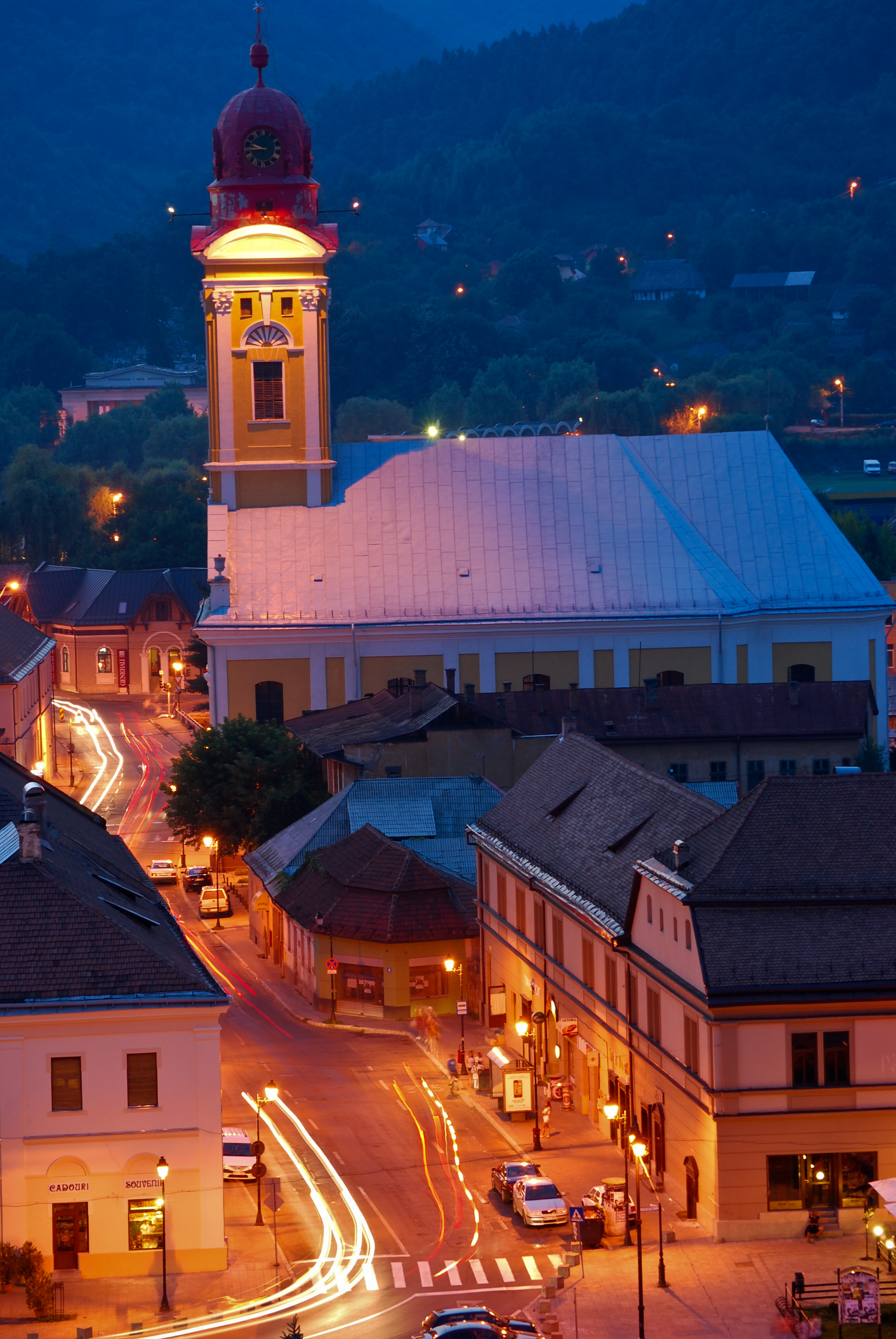
- Panoramic view of the old town Old Town at dawn House detail Stephen's Tower Holy Trinity Church Reformed Church

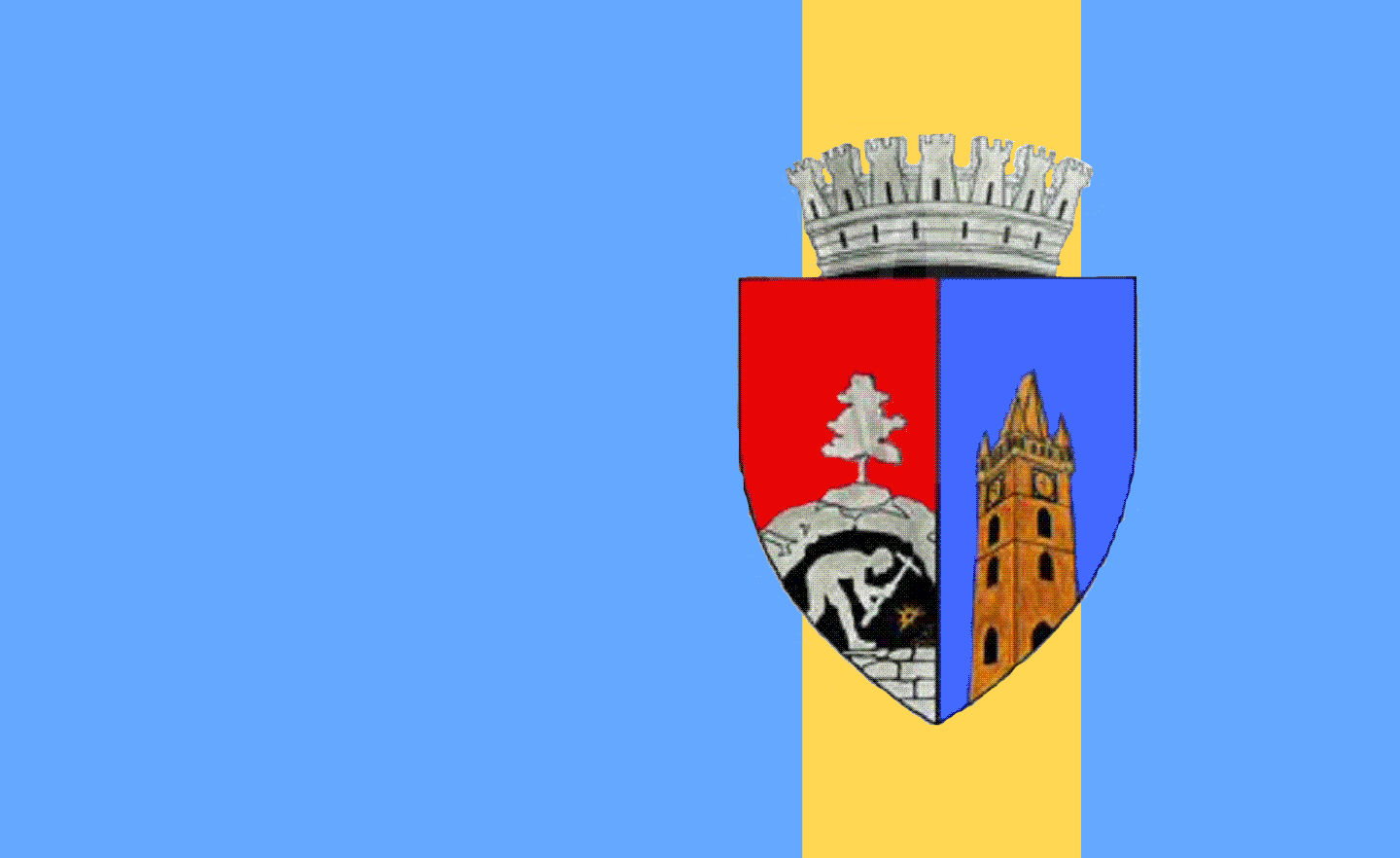
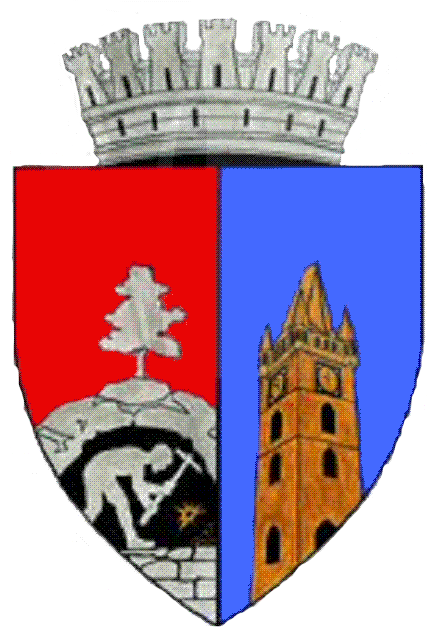
- Flag Coat of arms

- Location in Maramureș County

- Location in Romania
- Coordinates: 47°39′24″N 23°34′19″E
- Country: Romania
- County: Maramureș
- Status: County seat

Government
  - Mayor (2024–2028): Ioan-Doru Dăncuș (PSD)

Area
  - Total: 233.47 km^{2} (90.14 sq mi)
- Elevation: 228 m (748 ft)

Population (2021)
  - Total: 108,759
  - Density: 465.84/km^{2} (1,206.5/sq mi)
- Demonym(s): băimărean, băimăreancă (ro)
- Time zone: UTC+2 (EET)
  - Summer (DST): UTC+3 (EEST)
- Postal Code: 430311
- Area code: +40 262
- Car Plates: MM
- Climate: Dfb
- Website: www.baiamare.ro

Baia Mare (US: /ˌbɑːjə ˈmɑːrə/ BAH-yə MAR-ə, Romanian: [ˈbaja ˈmare]; Hungarian: Nagybánya; German: Frauenbach; Latin: Rivulus Dominarum) is a city in northwestern Romania, the capital and largest municipality of Maramureș County. It lies on the Săsar River and serves as an important economic, cultural, and educational centre of the historical region of Maramureș, a subregion of Transylvania.

Located south of the Igniș Mountains and Gutin Mountains, Baia Mare is situated approximately 600 kilometres (370 miles) northwest of Bucharest, 70 kilometres (43 miles) from the border with Hungary, and 50 kilometres (31 miles) from the border with Ukraine. According to the 2021 Romanian census, Baia Mare had a population of 108,759 inhabitants, making it one of the largest cities in northern Romania.

The municipality administers four villages: Blidari (Kőbánya), Firiza (Felsőfernezely) and Valea Neagră (Feketepatak).

Simon Hollósy, a young Hungarian painter, taught new Western European techniques in his Baia Mare studio, influencing many artists of the region.

Baia Mare was designated as the Romanian Youth Capital between 2 May 2018 and 1 May 2019. It is also considered the greenest municipality in Romania, offering about 133 square metres of green space per inhabitant.

== History ==
=== Prehistory ===
The city's development on the middle course of Săsar River, in the middle of a plateau with a warm Mediterranean-like climate, has facilitated living conditions since the Palaeolithic.

=== Ancient times ===
During the Bronze Age the region was inhabited by Thracian tribes. Later, it was included in the Dacian Kingdom formed by the King Burebista when the mining exploration began, as the area is rich in gold and silver.

=== Middle Ages ===
Baia Mare is first mentioned in written documents released by Charles I of Hungary in 1328 under the name of Rivulus Dominarum (English: Ladies' River). In 1347 the town was identified in documents by Louis I of Hungary as an important medieval town with a prosperous mining industry. Its rules of organisation were characteristic of the "free towns" of that time. In 1411 the town and its surrounding areas, including the mines, were transferred into the property of the Hunyadi family by Sigismund, King of Hungary (later also Holy Roman Emperor), who recognised Janos Hunyadi's contribution to stop the Turkish invasion of Europe.

The town went into a period of prosperity, during which the St. Stephen Cathedral was built. Today the cathedral tower is one of the best-known of the town's historic landmarks (see Stephen's Tower).

=== Modern period ===
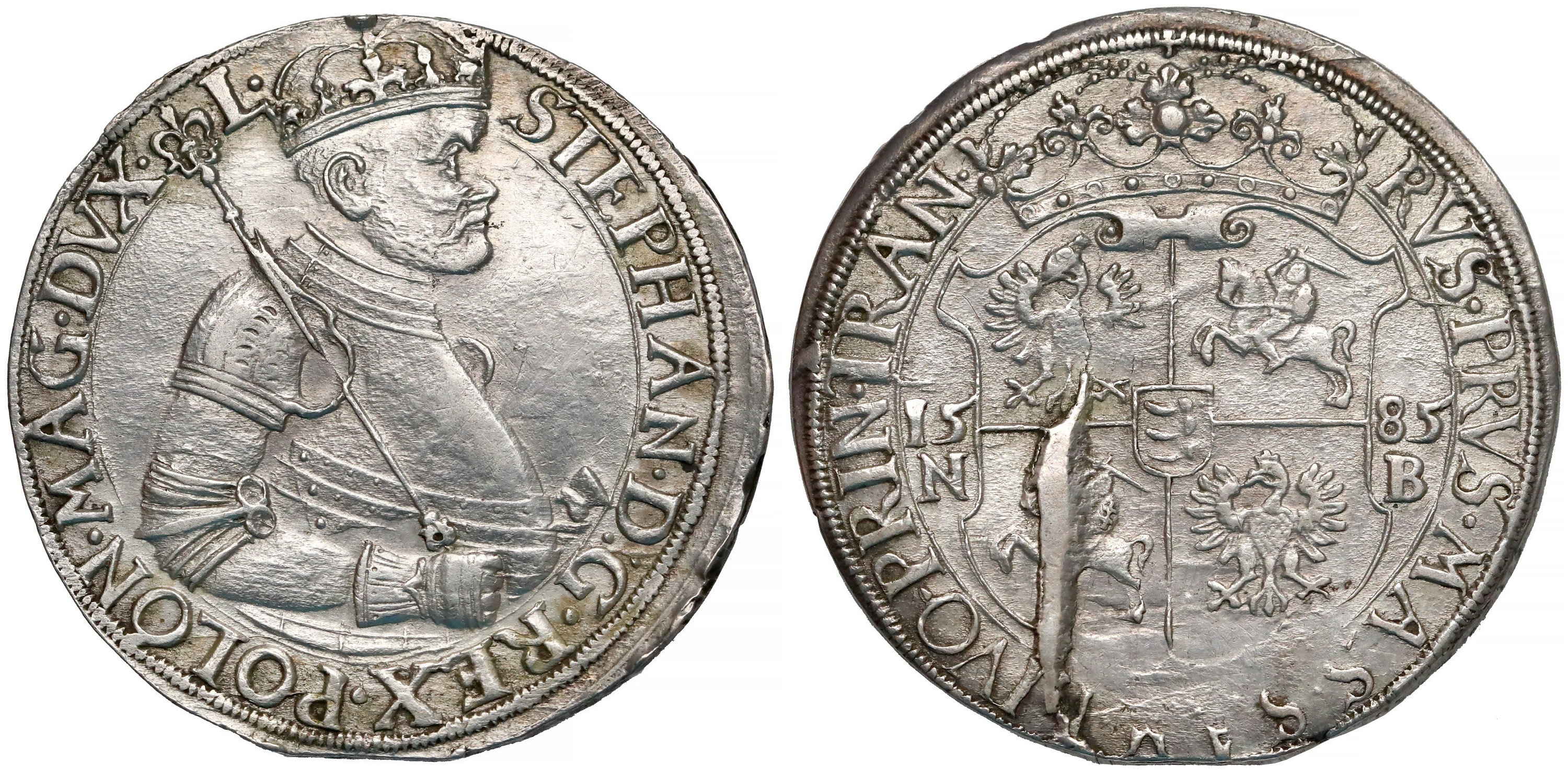
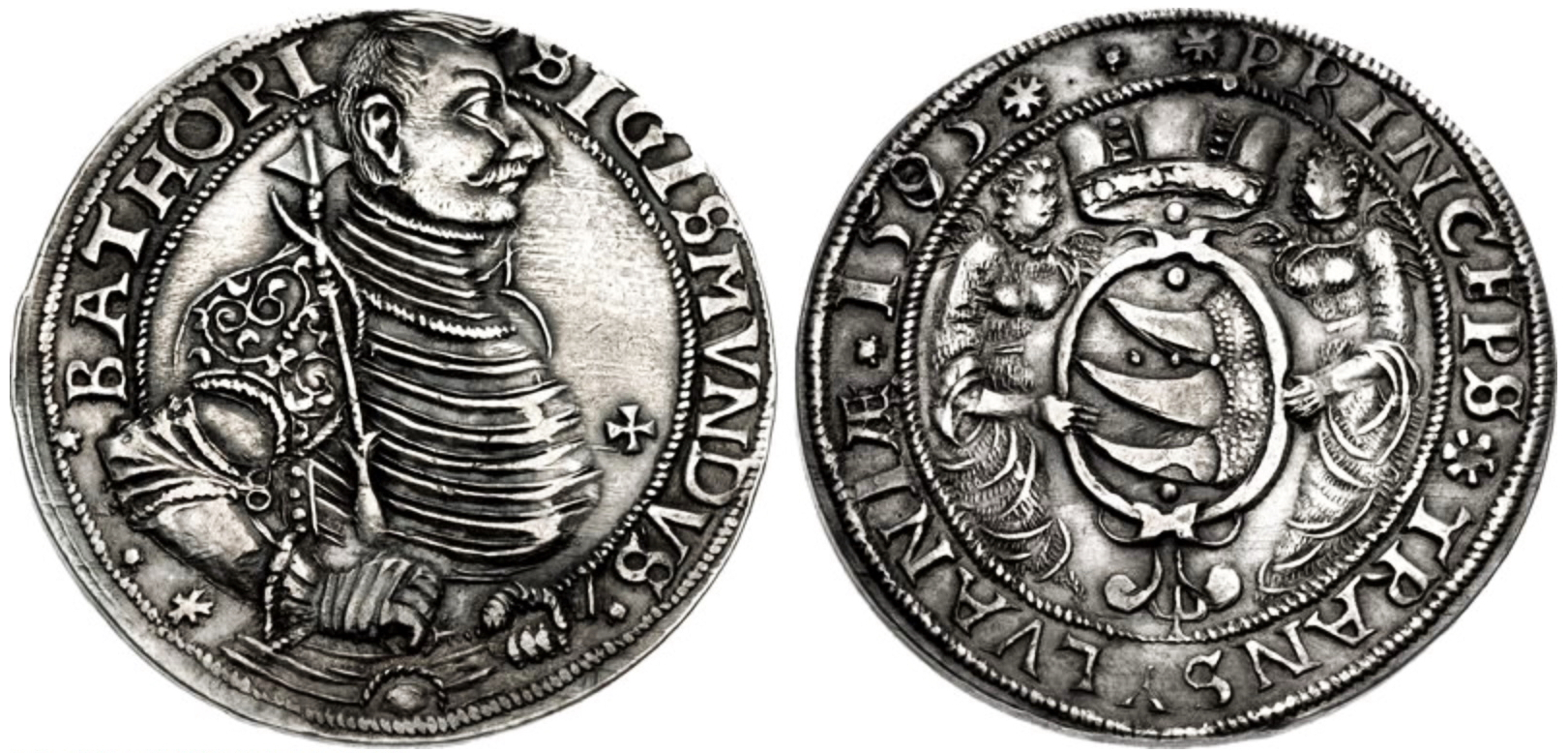
16th-century coins from the local mint

The first school, named Schola Rivulina, was opened in Baia Mare in 1547 by the Reformed Church following the Protestant Reformation. In 1703 Pintea Viteazul and his band managed to free the town for a short period of time from the Austrian rule, under which it belonged the royal treasury. Since then Pintea is considered an important figure in the town's history, representing the idea of freedom. The Budești Church has Pintea's chain mail shirt and a helmet, reportedly worn by him in his battles. The Museum of Baia Mare displays his weapons and their harness.

In 1748 the city's mining industry made a leap forward when the Austrian authorities created the headquarters of "Superior Mining".

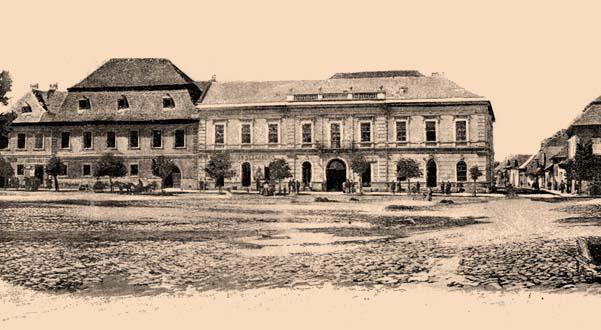
Baia Mare/Nagybánya town centre in 1890

In the late nineteenth century, Simon Hollósy, István Réti, János Thorma, Béla Iványi-Grünwald, and Károly Ferenczy were among numerous young Hungarians who left the area to study the arts in Munich, as Hungary lacked an academy of art in those times. Simon Hollósy, the young Hungarian painter, was teaching in his studio new western European techniques.

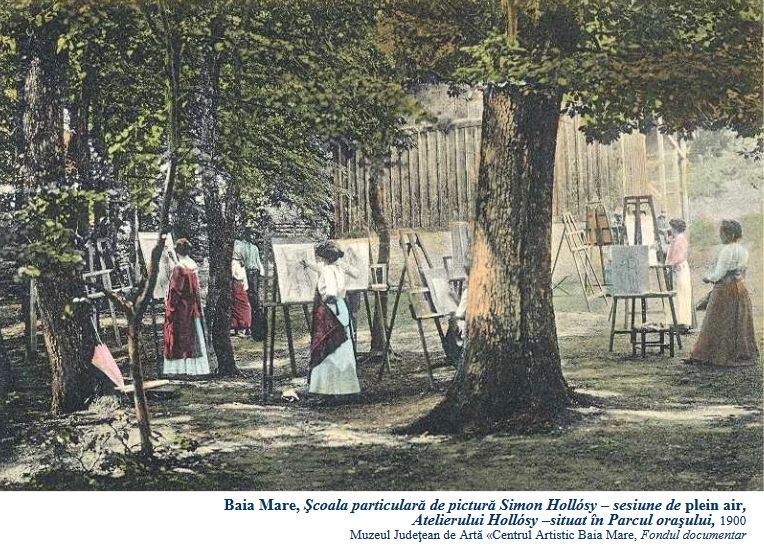
Simon Hollosy - Nagybánya/Baia Mare painting school in c. 1900

Some of those young painters decided to settle down together in Baia Mare, then called Nagybánya, to work on art. They persuaded Hollósy to join them and founded the Nagybánya artists' colony, working on naturalism and plein air painting. The artists' colony became known later on for influencing the development of twentieth-century Hungarian and Romanian art. Works by each of these important painters is held by the Hungarian National Gallery in Budapest, which in 2009 opened the exhibit, Munich in Hungarian, Hungarian Artists in Munich 1850-1914, 2 Oct 2009 - Jan 2010. In addition, in 1966 the museum held a major exhibition of their work: The Art of Nagybánya. Centennial Exhibition in Celebration of the Artists' Colony in Nagybánya.

Following World War I, the Austro-Hungarian Empire was dissolved, and in 1920, Baia Mare officially became part of the Kingdom of Romania. It became part of Hungary again in 1940 by the Second Vienna Award, until the end of World War II. Near the end of that period, the city hosted the Baia Mare ghetto. After the war, the city was returned to Romania. Shortly after World War II in postwar development, the town of Baia Mare started to grow both in population and inhabited area. In the late 1970s and early 1980s, a new town centre was developed with modern architecture buildings and structures.

==== Cyanide spill ====
On 30 January 2000, Baia Mare was the site of what has been considered Europe's worst ecological disaster since Chernobyl, which took place at gold mining company Aurul, a joint-venture of the Australian company Esmeralda Exploration and the Romanian government. The tailing dam at the gold processing plant broke and 100,000 m^{3} (3,531,467 cu ft) 70 tons of toxic cyanide and heavy metal-laced waste water escaped into the River Tisza and into Hungary, making its way into the Danube and affecting Romania, Hungary, Ukraine, Serbia, and Bulgaria. More than 1,400 tons of fish, numerous eagles, storks and otters died. Scientists fear the release may have led to the ultimate extinction of at least five fish species. Despite the accident's happening in Romania, much of the adverse effects were suffered in Hungary. The accident prompted Hungary to ban the use of cyanide in gold processing and it has urged the rest of Europe to do the same.

Since 2013, local Romanian (Romani) businessman Daniel Boldor has been operating out of the CUPROM mine and refinery outside of Baia Mare, selling what he claims are under-extracted ore concentrate shipments to international metal traders in China, South Korea, Thailand, and the United States. Based on claims that the material was, in fact, worthless mining sludge, the public prosecutor's office in Constanța filed an indictment against Boldor in June 2018 on charges of money laundering, customs fraud, document forgery, the collection and transport of hazardous waste, and tax evasion.

==== Roma wall ====
In 2011, the local administration built a 1.8m-tall wall between the road Strada Horea and an area of social housing that houses 1000 Roma people into one-room apartments, some without water or electricity. According to the mayor, this wall was designed to "prevent traffic accidents", while pro-democracy organizations say it amounts to a "roma wall" and "institutionalized racism".

In 2011, the national anti-discrimination council fined mayor Cătălin Cherecheș for the building of the wall and ordered it to be pulled down.

The wall nevertheless proved popular with the majority population and the mayor was overwhelmingly re-elected in 2012.

== Coat of arms ==
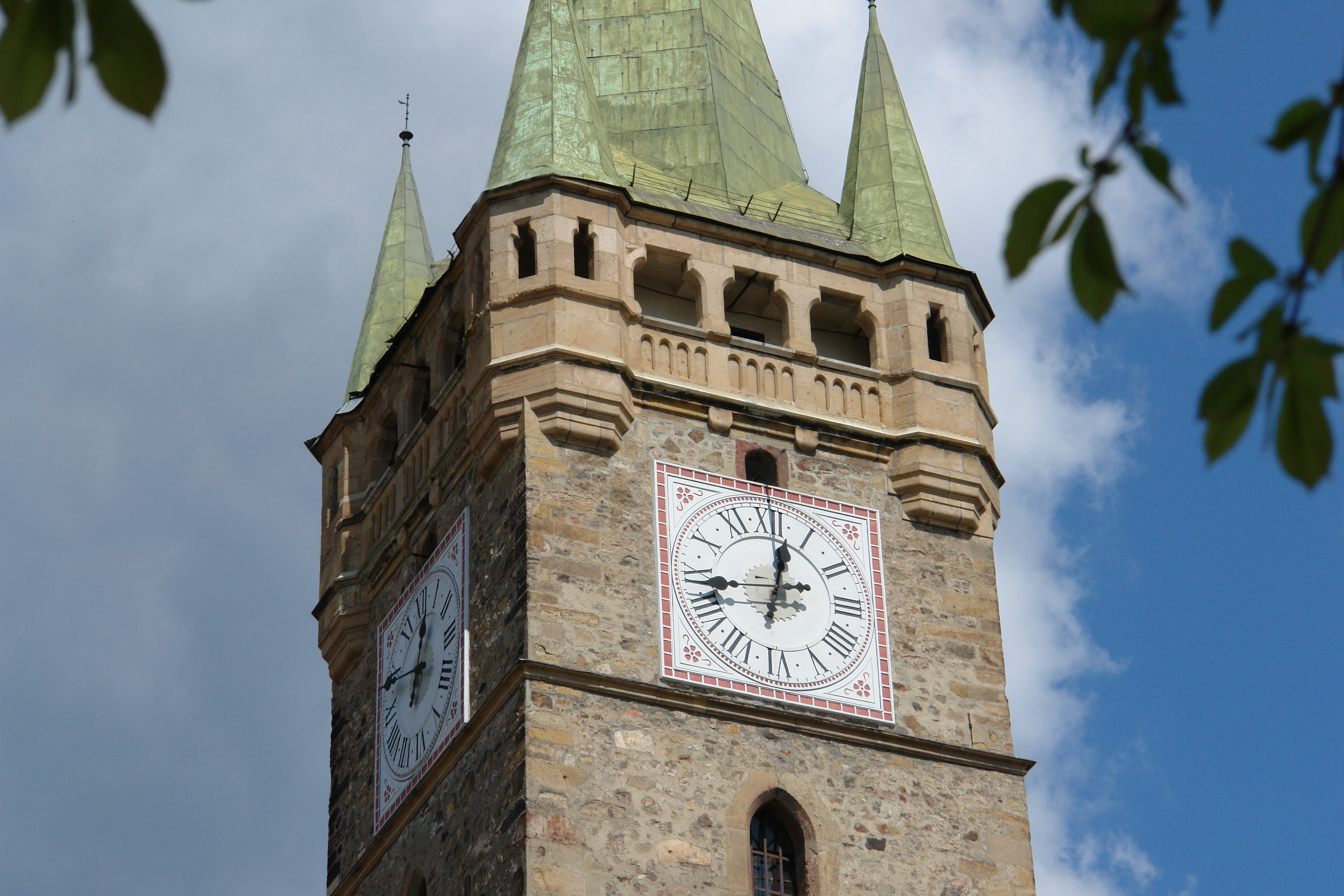
Stephen's Tower in the town centre

The coat of arms of Baia Mare was granted to the city by the Government in the late 1990s, early 2000s, some years after the communist symbols established in 1968 were de facto out of use starting 1989.

The shield is party per pale. In dexter, gules a miner in a mine argent, in sinister, azure a church tower or. The shield is topped by a mural crown with seven towers.

The miner refers to the main local economical activity. The church tower refers to the local cultural/ecclesiastical tradition. The crest shows the city's status as a county seat.

== Geography ==
The city is situated in the vicinity of the Gutâi and Igniș mountains. Altitudes reach 1,400 metres (4,600 feet) in some peaks. The area is famous for its outstanding landscapes, and the mountains are easily accessible from the city, notable routes being: Igniș (1,307 m), Mogoșa (1,246 m), Gutâi (1,443 m), Creasta Cocoșului (1,450 m), Piatra Șoimului (839 m), Pleștioara (803 m), Dealul Bulat (683 m), Murgău (633 m), Dealul Crucii (500 m), etc.

== Climate ==
The city is situated in the Baia Mare valley and is encircled on all sides by hills and mountains, which makes the climate in the city milder than the rest of the surrounding area. Proof of this is that the outskirts of Baia Mare are the only areas where one can find chestnut trees that usually need Mediterranean climate to grow. This is the northernmost reach of the chestnut tree. However, abrupt temperature changes take place and, during winters, the temperatures may occasionally drop below -20 degrees Celsius.

The summers are mild, cooler than in the rest of the country. The precipitations in this area are quite high, due to the mountains in the north and east which do not allow the air masses to pass beyond the region's limits, the average rainfall being almost 1,000 mm/year. The city of Baia Mare is the most populous of northern Romanian cities (Satu Mare, Suceava, and Botoșani), with a population of approximately 109,000. It also has a high level of culture and education, being home to theatres, schools, museums and art galleries.

Not far from the city there are a few very important natural reservations, among them Creasta Cocoșului, Cheile Tătărului, Lacul Albastru etc. Because of its privileged location in the Eastern Carpathian Mountains it is considered one of the most picturesque cities in Romania.

Climate data for Baia Mare (altitude 186m, 2014–2026 normals, extremes 1884–present)
Month	Jan	Feb	Mar	Apr	May	Jun	Jul	Aug	Sep	Oct	Nov	Dec	Year
Record high °C (°F)	21.0 (69.8)	20.1 (68.2)	26.6 (79.9)	31.5 (88.7)	33.7 (92.7)	38.2 (100.8)	39.5 (103.1)	39.0 (102.2)	36.1 (97.0)	32.0 (89.6)	27.7 (81.9)	17.5 (63.5)	39.5 (103.1)
Mean daily maximum °C (°F)	3.2 (37.8)	7.0 (44.6)	12.4 (54.3)	17.4 (63.3)	21.9 (71.4)	27.0 (80.6)	28.5 (83.3)	29.4 (84.9)	23.9 (75.0)	17.1 (62.8)	10.5 (50.9)	5.1 (41.2)	17.0 (62.5)
Daily mean °C (°F)	−0.1 (31.8)	3.2 (37.8)	6.9 (44.4)	11.3 (52.3)	15.8 (60.4)	20.8 (69.4)	22.0 (71.6)	22.4 (72.3)	17.7 (63.9)	11.7 (53.1)	6.6 (43.9)	2.5 (36.5)	11.7 (53.1)
Mean daily minimum °C (°F)	−3.3 (26.1)	−0.6 (30.9)	1.5 (34.7)	5.2 (41.4)	9.7 (49.5)	14.6 (58.3)	15.6 (60.1)	15.4 (59.7)	11.6 (52.9)	6.3 (43.3)	2.7 (36.9)	−0.1 (31.8)	6.6 (43.8)
Record low °C (°F)	−29.8 (−21.6)	−30.0 (−22.0)	−19.2 (−2.6)	−11.0 (12.2)	−7.5 (18.5)	0.0 (32.0)	4.5 (40.1)	−0.2 (31.6)	−3.0 (26.6)	−9.6 (14.7)	−16.0 (3.2)	−25.7 (−14.3)	−30.0 (−22.0)
Average precipitation mm (inches)	67.8 (2.67)	58.0 (2.28)	45.9 (1.81)	48.0 (1.89)	75.3 (2.96)	73.2 (2.88)	83.9 (3.30)	56.6 (2.23)	74.4 (2.93)	61.8 (2.43)	73.0 (2.87)	68.1 (2.68)	786 (30.93)
Average precipitation days (≥ 1.0 mm)	11.3	8.9	7.9	7.6	9.2	9.2	9.8	6.3	7.4	8.7	10.2	10.4	106.9
Average snowy days	10.8	5.1	1.2	1.1	0	0	0	0	0	0	2.0	7.3	27.5
Source: Meteomanz (2014-2026); Pogoda; ANM

== Demographics ==
Historical population
Year	Pop.	±%
1912	12,877	—
1930	13,904	+8.0%
1948	20,959	+50.7%
1956	35,920	+71.4%
1966	62,658	+74.4%
1977	100,985	+61.2%
1992	149,205	+47.7%
2002	137,976	−7.5%
2011	123,738	−10.3%
2021	108,759	−12.1%
Source: Census data

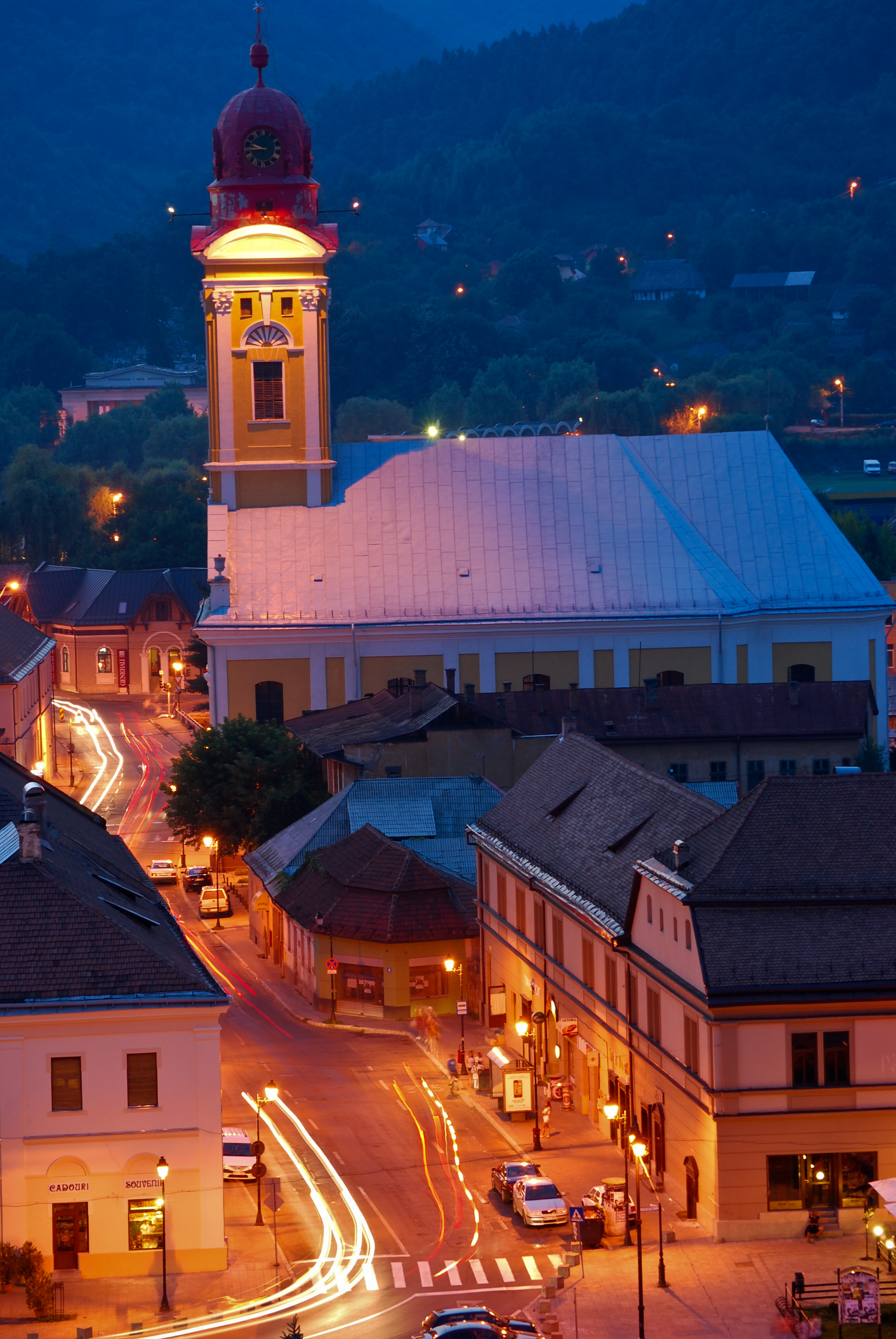
The Reformed church

At the 2021 census, Baia Mare had a population of 108,759. At the 2011 census, the city had a population of 123,738, a decrease from the figure recorded at the 2002 census.

The ethnic composition of the city is as follows:

- Romanian: (84.11%)
- Hungarian: (12.25%)
- Roma: (2.76%)
- Germans (i.e. Zipser Germans): (0.24%)
- Ukrainian: (0.16%)
- Jews: (0.02%)

and 642 others, including Greeks, Turks, Italians, Lipovans, Poles, and Slovaks.

Baia Mare metropolitan area has a population of 215,932, an area of 1,395.38 km^{2} (538.76 sq mi), and includes the municipality of Baia Mare, five towns (Baia Sprie, Cavnic, Seini, Șomcuta Mare, and Tăuții-Măgherăuș), and 13 communes (Cernești, Cicârlău, Coaș, Coltău, Copalnic-Mănăștur, Dumbrăvița, Groși, Mireșu Mare, Recea, Remetea Chioarului, Satulung, Săcălășeni, and Valea Chioarului).

=== Historical population ===
In 1912, out of the total population of 12,877 people, 9,992 were Hungarians (including Jews), 2,677 Romanians, and 175 Germans (i.e., Zipser Germans).

In 1920, of the 12,780 inhabitants, 5,005 were Romanians, 4,652 Hungarians, 1,792 Jews, 1,232 Germans, and 99 of other ethnicities. Many inhabitants declared themselves as Hungarian-speakers during previous censuses, despite not being ethnic Hungarians

Before the Second World War, Baia Mare had a community of more than 1,000 Jews. In 1944, most of the Jews were deported by the Hungarian occupation authorities to Nazi concentration and extermination camps. Most of the few survivors emigrated from the area. As of 2011, 32 Jews lived in the city. Along with Rădăuți, Gura Humorului and others, Baia Mare had a Jewish shtetl, or settlement. The synagogue dates from 1885.

== Politics ==
The Baia Mare Municipal Council, elected at the 2012 local elections, had the following political composition:

Party	Seats in 2008	Seats in 2012	Current Council
National Liberal Party (PNL)	9	8	
Social Democratic Party (PSD)	5	7	
Conservative Party (PC)	0	2	
Democratic Alliance of Hungarians in Romania (UDMR/RMDSZ)	3	2	
People's Party – Dan Diaconescu (PP-DD)	0	2	
Democratic Liberal Party (PDL)	6	1	
National Union for the Progress of Romania (UNPR)	0	1	

The Baia Mare Municipal Council, elected at the 2016 local elections, had the following political composition:

Party	Seats in 2012	Seats in 2016
Coalition for Baia Mare (FDGR-PNȚCD-PSRO-UNPR)	0	11
National Liberal Party (PNL)	8	3
Social Democratic Party (PSD)	7	3
Democratic Alliance of Hungarians in Romania (UDMR/RMDSZ)	2	2
Ecologist Party of Romania (PER)	0	2
People's Movement Party (PMP)	0	2

The Baia Mare Municipal Council, renewed at the 2020 local elections, consisted of 23 counsellors and had the following political composition:

Party	Seats in 2020
National Liberal Party (PNL)	7
Coalition for Maramureș (PSD)	7
Save Romania Union (USR)	4
People's Movement Party (PMP)	3
Democratic Alliance of Hungarians in Romania (UDMR/RMDSZ)	2

The Baia Mare Municipal Council, elected in the 2024 local elections, has the following composition:

Party	Seats in 2024
Social Democratic Party (PSD)	6
National Liberal Party (PNL)	5
United Right Alliance (ADU)	4
Democratic Alliance of Hungarians in Romania (UDMR/RMDSZ)	3
Verticala Nouă Party (V9)	3
Alliance for the Union of Romanians (AUR)	2

== Economy ==
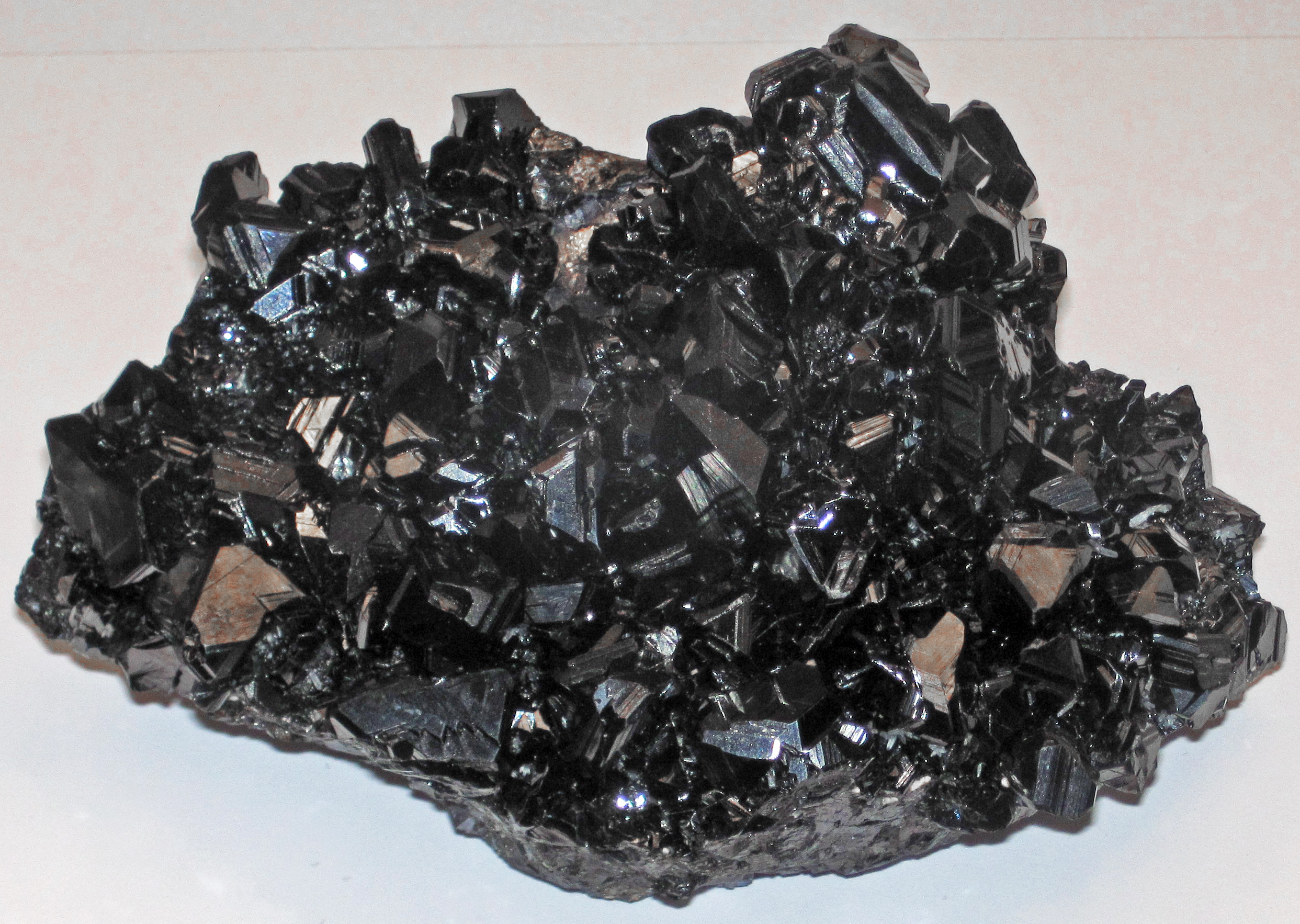
Sphalerite ore sample from the Herja Mine, Baia Mare, Carnegie Museum of Natural History specimen CM27810.

The economic activity of Baia Mare has been based on the mining activities located in the surrounding areas. However, after the 1989 Revolution and industrial changes, such mining declined considerably. They have been replaced with several activities which have improved the city's economy in recent years. Baia Mare has become one of the most economically evolved cities in the region. As a result, several supermarkets have been built in the city as well as one of the biggest shopping malls in over 100 km (62 mi) radius. The largest sofa manufacturing plant in Eastern Europe, Italsofa, is located near the Baia Mare city highway ring.

Aramis Invest is the largest furniture manufacturer and exporter in Romania. In 2014, it was the largest supplier on the local market of the Swedish company IKEA.

== Culture ==
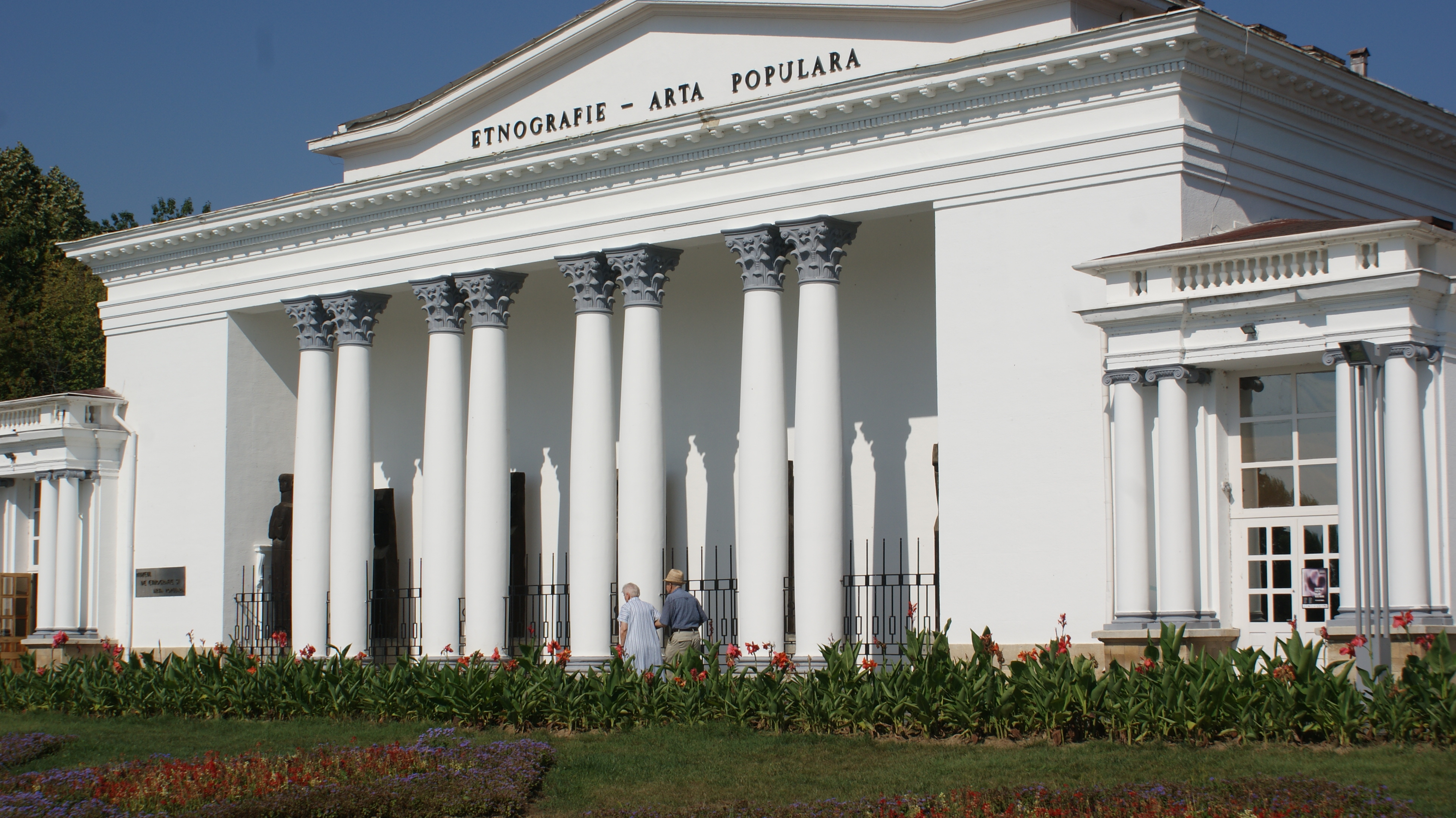
Ethnographic Museum in Baia Mare - frontal view

In Baia Mare there is one library (with a few branches), 6 museums, one planetarium and observatory, 2 theaters, 2 cultural centers, one art school and one popular university.

- The Cathedral of the Holy Trinity in Baia Mare is the second largest cathedral in Romania after the People's Salvation Cathedral in Bucharest.
- Planetarium and astronomical observatory Baia Mare — starting from 20 March 2015, modern planetarium equipment was put into use — the Zeiss Skymaster ZKP4 star projector — digitally assisted opto-mechanical projector, using LED technology, with clarity of the star field, an improvement over the old ZKP1 projector.
- Arts centre Baia Mare — Art Museum of Ethnography and Folk Art Museum Baia Mare
- Museum of Mineralogy Baia Mare - the museum houses a regional mineralogical collection many of the exhibits being considered world-unique and heritage values.
- Nagybánya artists' colony — The colony started as a summer retreat for artists, mainly painters from Simon Hollósy's szabadiskola (Free School) in Munich.
- Puppet Theater Baia Mare was founded on 1 June 1956, under the patronage of the Baia Mare Dramatic Theatre.
- County Museum of History and Archaeology Baia Mare
- Municipal Theatre Baia Mare — the first theatre troupe (semi-professional) was established in 1796, under the direction of János Nagy. On 30 December 1952, a State Theatre (later named "Dramatic", and currently "Municipal") was established, initially based in the "Popular" cinema hall.
- "Petre Dulfu" County Library is a public library with seven branches and is named after the philologist Petre Dulfu.
- Stephen's Tower — Over 40 metres (130 ft) high and built in a neo-Gothic style, it is a symbol of the city.

== Education ==
In Baia Mare there are 23 schools, 34 kindergartens and 18 highschools. Higher education is represented by:

- Northern University
- Bogdan Vodă University from Baia Mare
- Vatra University of Arts from Baia Mare
- Vasile Goldiș Western University Baia Mare
- Iuliu Hațieganu University of Medicine and Pharmacy Baia Mare extension

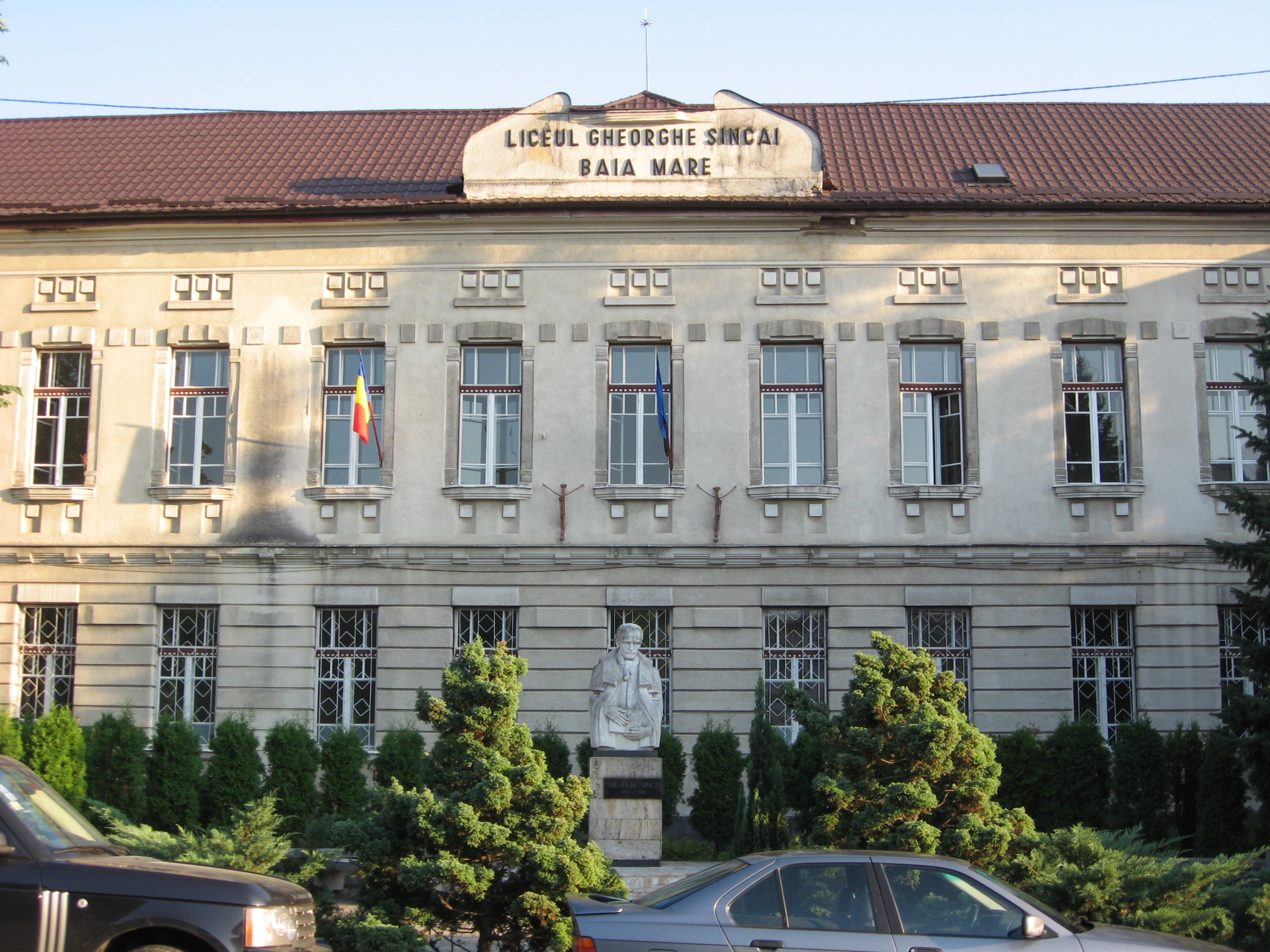
Gheorghe Șincai National College

National highschools from Baia Mare:

- Gheorghe Șincai National College
- Emil Racoviță Theoretical Highschool
- Vasile Lucaciu National College
- Mihai Eminescu National College
- Arts College
- "Nicolae Titulescu" Economics College
- Highschool of Sports
- "George Barițiu" Technical College
- "Anghel Saligny" Technical College
- "C.D. Nenițescu" Technical College
- "Németh László" Theoretical Highschool

== Health ==
There are three state hospitals in Baia Mare:

- Dr. Constantin Opriș" Emergency County Hospitall, was built between 1966 and 1971 and inaugurated in January 1972
- Infectious Diseases and Psychiatry Hospital, established in March 1981
- Dr. Nicolae Rușdea Pulmonary Hospital

== Natives ==
=== Sportsmen ===
- Eugen Apjok
- Camelia Balint-Hotea
- Alin Bota
- Daniel Brata
- Cristian Bud
- Romulus Buia
- Claudiu Bumba
- Rodica Dunca
- Melinda Geiger
- Vasile Gergely
- Ioan Gherghel
- Ovidiu Hoban
- Ákos Koller
- Noemi Lung
- Teodora Măgurean
- Darius Makaria
- Vasile Miriuță
- Bogdan Pereș
- Daniel Sabou
- Alexandru Terheș
- Raluca Udroiu
- Ciprian Vasilache

=== Singers and composers ===
- Dora Cojocaru - composer and musicologist
- Gheorghe Costin - conductor and composer
- Adrian Sina- singer and composer
- Paula Seling - singer and composer
- AMI (Romanian singer) - singer and composer

=== Painters ===
- Adrian Ghenie
- István Réti

=== Others ===
- Csaba Ferenc Asztalos - politician
- Mihai Morar - entertainment journalist
- Lucian Mureșan - Cardinal, Major Archbishop of Făgăraș-Alba Iulia
- László Németh - writer

== Residents ==
=== Writers, poets ===
- Augustin Buzura - novelist, Romanian literature
- Mária Földes - Romanian born Jewish-Hungarian playwright
- Florin Tătaru - Romanian politician
- Igor Ursenco - Romanian fiction writer, poet, and culturologist

== Twin towns – sister cities ==
Baia Mare is twinned with:

- Bielsko-Biała, Poland (2001)
- Combs-la-Ville, France (2009)
- Hódmezővásárhely, Hungary (2001)
- Hollywood, United States (2001)
- Khankendi, Azerbaijan (2026)
- Kitwe, Zambia (1972)
- Nyíregyháza, Hungary (2001)
- Serino, Italy (2003)
- Szolnok, Hungary (1990)
- Wels, Austria (2000)

== Structures ==
- Chimney of Phoenix Copper Smelter, height: 351.5 metres, which is the tallest structure in Romania.
