= Stephen's Tower =

Stephen's Tower may refer to:

Hungary:

- Stephen's Tower (Budapest)

Romania:

- Stephen's Tower (Baia Mare)
- Stephen's Tower (Piatra Neamţ)
