= Daniel Boldor =

Romanian man accused of selling hazardous waste as gold concentrate

Daniel Boldor (born Daniel Cristian Boldor) is a businessman from Baia Mare, Romania, and the CEO of Exiteco SRL, who has been accused of fraud and forgery after his company sold thousands of tons of mining sludge to international metal traders as "gold [or copper] concentrate".

== Background ==
Boldor, a member of the Roma community, grew up in Fersig, a village 30 mi (48 km) south of Baia Mare in the Satulung commune. In 2001, aged 24, Boldor travelled to West London, where he worked in the construction trade. His first job was demolishing bathrooms and kitchens in the Harrow and Notting Hill neighborhoods. By 2007, he had set up his own construction firm, operating across the UK, and he brought his four younger brothers from Romania to manage his various building sites. His projects included refurbishing the 100-room Enterprise Hotel in Earls Court and renovating the Harrow Central Mosque.

Boldor claims the inspiration to start his business came to him in 2011, during a conversation with a former manager of the Cuprom mines. The local, he says, described Cuprom's mining equipment under Ceaușescu to be "rudimentary", incapable of fully extracting the most fine-grained gold or copper from its ore. Since Cuprom was built on a swamp, this local said, the only way to maintain structural integrity while building out the complex over the years had been to use this under-extracted backfill to fill in the marshland.

In 2012, Baia Mare's mayor declared hundreds of Roma shanties just outside the city unfit for habitation and forced the families to relocate into an abandoned block of offices in the Cuprom complex. For decades, Roma had made a living selling scrap metal from the same facilities. In 2013, Boldor began hiring individuals from this Roma community to dig out, package, and sell the so-called "metal concentrate" for him.

== Exitico SRL and Minero Remediation ==
In late 2015, 123 containers containing 2,723 tons of material sold to Chinese investors by Boldor's company arrived in Hong Kong. The containers were supposed to contain copper concentrate, a mining product that should have at least 30% or more of pure copper by weight, according to industry standards. However, when environmental regulators in Shanghai performed a customs check on one container, they found black rubble littered with chunks of concrete rubble and rusty bottle caps. Upon testing, the material was found to contain unsafe levels of cadmium and arsenic, a mark of possible mining waste rather than "ore concentrate". After being turned away at ports in Thailand and Malaysia, and a year of languishing in the docks in Hong Kong, authorities shipped the materials back to Romania, where it sat in an industrial park in Constanța. An anonymous email in November 2016 alerted an official in Romania's National Environmental Guard to the incident, and the official forwarded it for investigation to Constanța's public prosecutor's office.

By 2017, according to Boldor's records, his company had shipped ten million tons of "mineral concentrate" out of Baia Mare to various international partners, in places such as China, South Korea, Singapore, Macau, South Africa, the United Arab Emirates, Belgium, Vietnam, and the United States, and had received more than six million euros in payment.

== 2018 prosecution ==
In June 2018, following an investigation of Boldor's operations, the public prosecutor's office in Constanța filed an indictment against Boldor on charges of money laundering, customs fraud, document forgery, improper collection and transport of hazardous waste, and tax evasion.

== 2021 ==
Following the indictment, Boldor abandoned his original business interests and instead got involved in real estate. As of 2021, his company still owned around 40% of the Cuprom facility and planned to redevelop it into an industrial park using funds from selling supposedly vast under-extracted ore deposits underneath the mining complex. A second company headed by Brașov businessman Cristian Eftinca holds the other 60% and plans to develop the lands into a photovoltaic park and the remaining 351.4-meter tall Cuprom chimney into a tourist attraction as the tallest chimney in Romania and third tallest in Europe.
