= Teodora Măgurean =

Romanian handball player (born 1998)

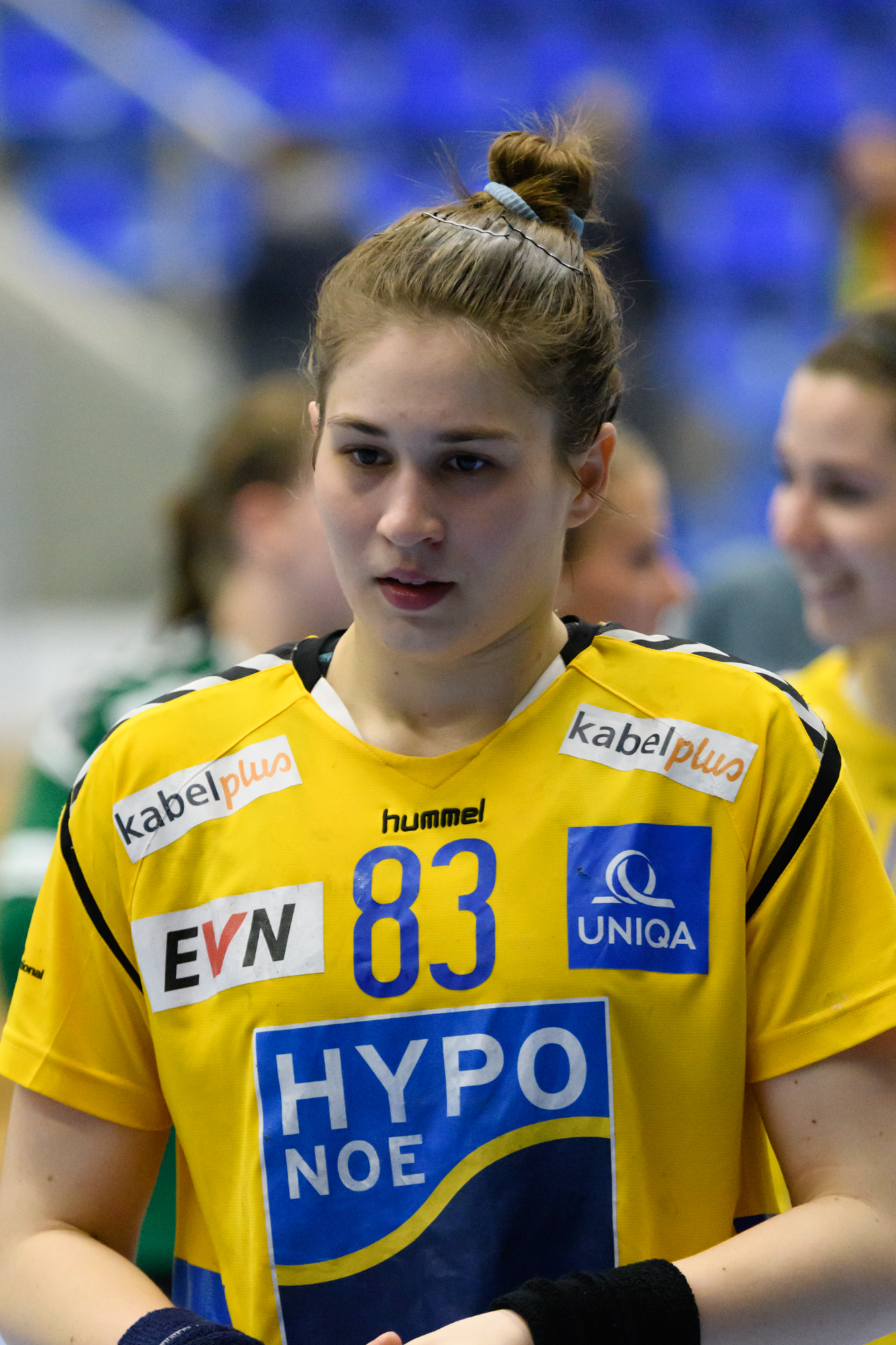

Personal information
- Full name: Teodora Măgurean
- Nationality: Romanian
- Born: 14 March 1998 (age 28) Baia Mare, Romania
- Height: 1.78 m (5 ft 10 in)

Sport
- Sport: Handball
- Position: Centre back
- Current club: Hypo Niederösterreich
- Number: 83

Youth career
- Years: Team
- –: CSŞ2 Baia Mare
- –: CS Extrem Baia Mare

Senior clubs
- Years: Team
- –2017: CS Extrem Baia Mare
- 2017–2019: Hypo Niederösterreich

Teodora Măgurean (born 14 March 1998) was a Romanian handballer who played for Hypo Niederösterreich.
