= Satulung =

- Commune
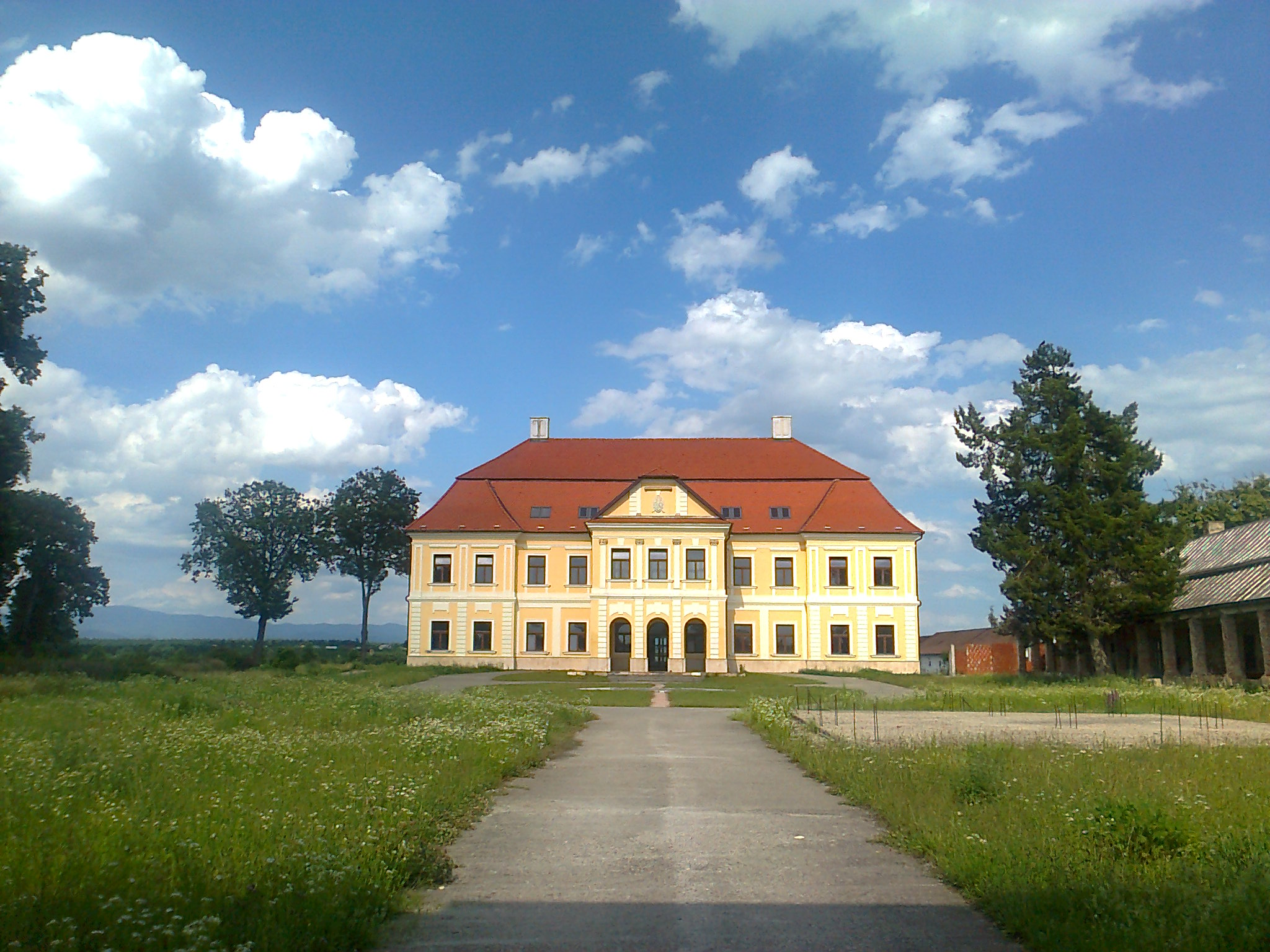
- Teleki Castle in Satulung

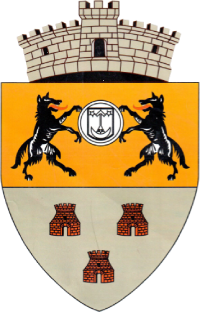
- Coat of arms

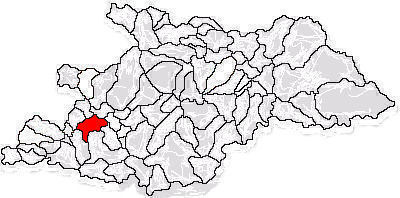
- Location in Maramureș County

- Location in Romania
- Coordinates: 47°34′N 23°26′E
- Country: Romania
- County: Maramureș
- Subdivisions: Arieșu de Pădure, Fersig, Finteușu Mic, Hideaga, Mogoșești, Pribilești, Satulung

Government
  - Mayor (2020–2024): Bujorel-Vasile Mureșan (CMM)
- Area: 68.50 km^{2} (26.45 sq mi)
- Elevation: 165 m (541 ft)
- Population (2021-12-01): 6,376
  - Density: 93.08/km^{2} (241.1/sq mi)
- Time zone: UTC+02:00 (EET)
  - Summer (DST): UTC+03:00 (EEST)
- Postal code: 437270
- Area code: +40 x59
- Vehicle reg.: MM
- Website: primariasatulung.ro

Satulung (Hungarian: Kővárhosszúfalu, "stone castle long village"; German: Langendorf, "long village") is a commune in Maramureș County, Romania. Its name, translated in English, means "the long village". It is composed of seven villages: Arieșu de Pădure (Erdőaranyos), Fersig (Fehérszék), Finteușu Mic (Kisfentős), Hideaga (Pusztahidegkút), Mogoșești (Magosfalu), Pribilești (Pribékfalva), and Satulung.

== Geography ==
The commune belongs to the Baia Mare metropolitan area. It is located in the southwestern part of the Maramureș County, 17 km (11 mi) from the county seat, Baia Mare. The river Arieș flows through Arieșu de Pădure village.

The Fersig train station serves the CFR Main Line 400, which connects Brașov with Baia Mare and Satu Mare.

== Demographics ==
Historical population
Year	Pop.	±%
1880	2,973	—
1900	4,118	+38.5%
1910	4,304	+4.5%
1930	4,525	+5.1%
1956	5,340	+18.0%
1977	5,793	+8.5%
1992	5,256	−9.3%
2002	5,409	+2.9%
2011	5,837	+7.9%
2021	6,376	+9.2%
Source: Census data

At the 2021 census, the population of Satulung was 6,376, of which 67.14% were ethnic Romanians and 23.35% Roma. At the 2011 census, the population of the commune was 5,837, more than at the previous census in 2002, when 5,409 inhabitants were registered. The majority were ethnic Romanians (75.07%); the main minorities were the Roma people (19.86%) and the Hungarians (1.59%); for 3.41% of the population, ethnicity was not known.

== People ==
- Daniel Boldor, businessman from Baia Mare, was born in Fersig
- Blanka Teleki (1806–1862), who founded a school, was born in Satulung
