= Henri Tomasi =

French composer and conductor (1901–1971)

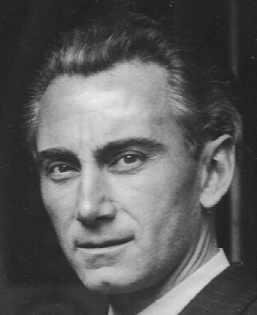

Henri Frédien Tomasi (pronounced [ɑ̃ʁi fʁedjɛ̃ tomazi]; 17 August 1901 – 13 January 1971) was a French classical composer and conductor. He was noted for compositions such as In Praise of Folly, Nuclear Era and The Silence of the Sea.

== Early years ==
Henri Tomasi was born in a working-class neighborhood of Marseille, France, on 17 August 1901. His father Xavier Tomasi and mother Josephine Vincensi were originally from La Casinca, Corsica. When he was five, the family moved to Mazargues, France where Xavier Tomasi worked as a postal worker. There, he enrolled his son in music theory and piano lessons. At the age of seven, Tomasi entered the Conservatoire de Musique de Marseille. Pressured by his father, he played for upper-class families, where he felt "humiliated to be on show like a trained animal."

In 1913, the family moved back to Marseille. Tomasi had dreams of becoming a sailor and skipped many of his music classes. During the summer, he stayed with his grandmother in Corsica and learned traditional Corsican songs. In 1916, he won first prize in harmony, along with his friend Zino Francescatti, the celebrated violinist. World War I delayed his entrance into the Paris Conservatoire, so he played piano in Marseille to earn money. He performed in diverse venues such as upscale hotels, restaurants, brothels, and movie houses. His gift for composition was developed during this time as he excelled in improvisation at the keyboard. The early Charlie Chaplin films also intrigued him and influenced his works.

== The 1920s ==
In 1921, he commenced his studies at the Conservatoire de Paris with a scholarship from the municipality of Marseille and a stipend from a lawyer, Maitre Levy Oulman. He still performed at cafes and in the cinemas to earn money. His friend Maurice Franck described Tomasi as a hard worker: "He showed up with a fugue a week, he was indefatigable - an inveterate workaholic." In 1925, his first piece, a wind quintet called 'Variations sur un Theme Corse', won the Prix Halphen. His teachers at the Paris Conservatoire included Gaubert, Vincent d'Indy, Georges Caussade, and Paul Vidal. In 1927, he won the second Grand Prix de Rome for his cantata, 'Coriolan', and a First Prize for Orchestral Conducting, which were both awarded unanimously. That same year, he met his future wife, Odette Camp, at the Opéra-Comique. They wed in 1929. Tomasi began his career as a conductor for Concerts du Journal.

== The 1930s ==
From 1930 to 1935 Tomasi served as the music director of the Radio Colonial Orchestra in French Indochina, which was founded by Julien Maigret during the 1931 Colonial Exhibition in Paris. Tomasi became one of the first radio conductors and a pioneer of "radiophonic" music. During the 1930s he was one of the founders of a contemporary music group in Paris entitled Triton along with Prokofiev, Milhaud, Honegger, and Poulenc. He spent equal time composing and conducting. He was one of the conductors for studio broadcasts of the Orchestre Radio Symphonique de la Radiodiffusion Francaise. He made his most memorable recording in 1936 with the extraordinary French mezzo-soprano Alice Raveau in Gluck's Orfeo, which was awarded the Grand Prix du Disque. In 1939 Tomasi was drafted into the French Army and was named marching-band conductor at the Villefranche sur Mer fort.

== The 1940s ==
In 1940 he was discharged and took up the baton at the Orchestre national de la Radiodiffusion française. As a composer, his orchestral music is important, but above all he was attracted to the theater. In the realm of instrumental music, he preferred composing for wind instruments. He composed concerti for flute, oboe, clarinet, saxophone, bassoon, trumpet, horn, and trombone. He also composed concerti for violin and viola. In 1944, his son Claude was born and Tomasi started composing a Requiem dedicated to "the martyrs of the resistance movement and all those who have died for France." Tomasi was disillusioned by the events of World War II and subsequently rejected all faith in God. His Requiem was set aside and was not discovered again or recorded until 1996. In 1946, Tomasi assumed the post of conductor of the Opera de Monte Carlo. He became extremely sought after as a guest conductor all over Europe. In 1948, he wrote what would become his most popular composition, the Concerto for Trumpet. In 1949 the Concerto for Saxophone was performed by Marcel Mule.

An hour-long documentary film about the composer produced by Jacques Sapiega was made in 2001.

== Later life ==
In 1956 he composed the Concerto for Clarinet and the Concerto for Trombone. This same year brought the long-awaited world premiere of his opera Don Juan de Mañara based on a text by poet O. V. de L. Milosc. This opera, "L'Atlantide", and the comic opera "Le Testament du Père Gaucher" collectively established his reputation as an opera composer.

In May 1956 at Bordeaux, his opera Sampiero Corso was premiered, with the Australian tenor Kenneth Neate in the title role. It was repeated at the Holland Festival in June.

In 1957, Tomasi stopped conducting because of physical problems, including advancing deafness in his right ear. In 1966 Jean-Pierre Rampal played his Concerto for Flute with the Orchestre des Concerts Classiques in Marseille. His last piece for the theater, "In Praise of Madness (the nuclear era)", is a cross between opera and ballet and contains references to Nazism and napalm. It reflects Tomasi's postwar disillusionment with mankind. During his last period of composition he was motivated by political events and wrote pieces such as the Third World Symphony and Chant pour le Vietnam. In 1969, he held a series of interviews with his son, Claude, called "Autobiography with a Tape Recorder." (Tomasi assoc.) In 1970 he composed a concerto for double bass and orchestra. As his health deteriorated, he began working on an operatic version of Hamlet. On 13 January 1971 he died peacefully in his apartment in Montmartre, Paris. He was buried in his wife's family tomb in Avignon. Later, to celebrate the centennial of his birth, his ashes were moved to the village of his ancestors in Penta di Casinca, Corsica.

== Music ==
Tomasi's music is fundamentally lyrical. Diatonic and chromatic melodic lines predominate, supported by tertian and polychordal harmonies. His music is highly colorful and one can hear the influence of his French contemporaries. Sounds and colors of Corsica, Provence, Cambodia, Laos, the Sahara and Tahiti are used. He also wrote music inspired by medieval religious songs. He utilized many styles including Oriental recitative and twelve tone techniques but they were always personal and unique to him.

Tomasi said: "Although I haven't shirked from using the most modern forms of expression, I've always been a melodist at heart. I can't stand systems and sectarianism. I write for the public at large. Music that doesn't come from the heart isn't music." (Tomasi assoc.)

His earliest influence stemmed from a performance his mother took him to of the opera La bohème. He wept over the tribulations of the main character, Mimi. In fact, he felt that La bohème was responsible for his musical destiny. It gave him a great passion for lyrical theater. Later he heard Bizet's Carmen and learned about Mussorgsky through Boris Godunov, and Debussy through Pelléas et Mélisande. He was influenced by Ravel, and later by Richard Strauss. Richard Wagner was never an influence on him. His harmonic inspiration derived from Debussy and Ravel. He felt that his experience from conducting enabled him to orchestrate with more skill. He felt that dodecaphonic music could be used occasionally when needed or called for. He thought that the inherent danger in electronic music was that it was devoid of the human factor: "...the end of the heart -a world filled with nothing more than the sound of machines!" (Tomasi assoc.) Tomasi frequently based his works on a text of some sort, even if words were not actually used. To translate Tomasi's views on his own music: "My musical knowledge is not based on any system. The sensibility expresses itself and the mind controls. What good is it to invent new forms of speech? Everything has been said and everything has been done." (Tomasi assoc.) Tomasi was primarily interested in "man and his passionate style." (Tomasi assoc.)

Nocturne was first published in 1954 by Pierre Noel. The copyright was later taken over by Gerard Billaudot in 1999. It is marked Lent and has a surreal quality. It is intensely lyrical and expressive. There are polychords present. There is constant eighth-note movement. The slow section evolves to a poco pui agitato interlude followed by a short cadenza marked a piacere (freely). The initial tempo returns and the song ends in calm repose with an unusual closing chord: the C minor seventh. Complainte du Jeune Indien was composed in 1949 and published the same year by Alphonse Leduc. It is cordially dedicated to Monsieur Beaucamp. The French word Complainte refers to a lament or plaint. Perhaps one can conjecture that the jeune (young) Indian is expressing nostalgia for his homeland. (Gordon) It is marked tristamente (sadly) in a slow Andante tempo. The harmonic motion is very slow with only a G minor chord until rehearsal #2. The chords move in parallel motion similar to Debussy. Before the brief cadenza at rehearsal #4, there is a "B" eleventh chord. This cadenza is optional; another optional cut is between rehearsal #8 to #11, which eliminates the second brief cadenza. These cuts will not be taken in this performance. The initial theme returns, and it closes even more slowly and sadly.

The Danse Nuptiale (Wedding Dance) was originally composed as a work for chamber orchestra and soloists in 1961. It was published by Alphonse Leduc in 1962 and dedicated to Andre Boutard. The original instrumentation was for oboe, clarinet, bassoon, French horn, tuba, tympani, a battery of percussion, piano, and string quintet. The first movement, Danse Agreste (Rustic Dance) in the original work features the oboe. The second movement, Danse Profane, has the French horn as soloist. The Danse Sacree (Sacred Dance) features a tuba soloist, and the fifth movement, Danse Guerriere (War Dance), highlights the bassoon. There is a woodwind quintet version of this entire work dating from 1963. The transcription was dedicated to the Rejeliovo Decliove Quintet from Prague. In the third movement of the quintet, the bassoon is the soloist instead of the tuba. The marking at the beginning is Bien scande, which refers to placing much stress or accent when indicated. (Gordon) There are a plethora of accents sprinkled throughout this brief movement. It opens with a quick two bar ostinato in 3/8. The changing meters give it impetus. It is in ABA form with the interior section marked Lent and fantasque This is punctuated by a figure marked 'brusquement' and counteracted with three bars marked 'tendrement'. The "A" section returns briefly with the main theme ostinato.

Introduction et Danse was composed in 1949 and dedicated to the clarinetist Louis Cahuzac. It was published in 1949 by Alphonse Leduc. It can be performed with clarinet and piano or clarinet and orchestra. It is a stylish handling of different dance moods. The entire range of the clarinet with respect to pitch and dynamics is utilized. A polychord opens the Andantino introduction. This fantasia like beginning has a short clarinet cadenza with a descending arpeggiated figure that will later appear in the dance. This is followed by a section in serial form that is soft and brooding in mood. The dance starts with an ostinato in the piano and cascading arpeggios in the clarinet. The dance is a play with freedom and constraint. There are numerous markings indicating slight fluctuations in tempo. The wealth of tone color and motivic work are reminiscent of Ravel. Chords move in parallel motion as in Debussy's writing, but are more dissonant, The work concludes with assai lento marked con malinconia.

Sonatine Attique is for solo clarinet and is, reputedly, a "poetic recollection of a night spent by Henri Tomasi under the Greek sky near the Parthenon in Athens." (Woodwind.org) It was composed in 1966 and published in 1967 by Alphonse Leduc. It is dedicated to the foremost French clarinetist of the time, Ulysse Delecluse, who premiered it in Rennes, France. His Evocations for solo oboe or solo saxophone are written in a similar guise and call on the music of Peru, Cambodia, Nigeria and Scotland. Tomasi is referring to Ancient Greece's Attica (L'Attique) whose capital is Athens. The adjective attique refers to Attica, characteristic of the Athenians and their language, art, and literature. It has a connotation of delicacy, refinement, and gracefulness. The Ancient Greek Attica dialect was closely related to the refined Ionic language of the great Greek writers such as Aescchylus, Sophocles, and Euripides. (Gordon) The first and third movements of the work are senza misura (without meter). It is improvisatory in nature and Tomasi uses motives and develops them like his French compatriot, Jolivet. The first movement is marked Giocoso (playfully) and Tomasi makes chords out of the arpeggiated figures in the clarinet. This movement is in sonata form with a sostenuto section framed by the giocoso sections featuring complex rhythms and large leaps in register. The second movement is marked Mysterieux. A cadenza connects this to a Scherzando that is independent in form and fluctuates between 3/8 and 2/8. The soft motif in the low register returns to close the movement. The last movement uses rhythm and accents as a cohesive force. There is a brief slow interlude before the first tempo returns. The movement pulsates with perpetual motion until the end.

The Concerto for Clarinet and Orchestra was also dedicated to Ulysse Delecluse and was published by Alphonse Leduc in 1953. Unfortunately, there is no commercial CD recording available with clarinet and orchestra and only one recording with piano reduction (Actually, the clarinet concerto was recorded with orchestra and released on the CD "20th Century Clarinet Concertos" by the Koch Schwann label). Undoubtedly the orchestration is colorful, although it retains its charm with piano. Tomasi composed in an economical manner, deriving thematic material from motivic cells. The first movement was chosen to be the Paris Conservatory Examination Solo in 1953. Later, the second and third movements were the Contest Solo at the Paris Conservatory in 1966. Delecluse observed that "the concerto had gained enormous popularity throughout Europe; many critics consider it a masterpiece." (qtd. in Gee 20) It deserves to have greater notoriety today. The first movement is in sonata form and starts with an E flat/D Major polychord. Usually a conventional concerto has an exposition in the orchestra, but here the clarinet starts unaccompanied with a similar figure to Bach's E Major Partita for Solo Violin (Lerner 7). The second theme is stated in the piano at rehearsal #11. A long cadenza connects back to the original theme and ends with rhythmic material in 7/8. There are traditional key centers in a flexible framework. The nontraditional elements include polychords, chords with added notes, clusters, and dissonance. The clarinet exhibits a freedom of key relationships and tonal centers. The second movement opens with a motive from the first movement. This introduction is followed with ternary form with return above an ostinato of Sicilian rhythm. The short development at rehearsal #10 is followed by a recapitulation at rehearsal #15. The virtuoso Scherzo finale is in a sonata rondo construction. A combination of meters is used: 4/4 12/8, 3/4 9/8, 2/4 6/8. The concerto comes to a blazing conclusion after the final statement of theme "A". Henri Tomasi wrote his own notes on the concerto in 1957 and they are printed on the Tomasi Association of France website. He says of the first movement, "of odd and burlesque pace, the principal topic must be interpreted like an improvisation, with some lyric and dark abandonments rather discrete. A significant rate of frightening difficulty will bring us back little by little to a tempo first more stressed, to lead to final giocoso…" He says of the Nocturne (Night): "Mysterious recalls of the first principal theme will be like a romantic daydream. The dialogue between soloist and orchestra will be increasingly pressing, to go towards a lyrical and impassioned exultation. The conclusion will be melancholy." He describes the Scherzo-finale, "Furious accents will disturb this quietude. Suddenly, it will be a romantic and fantastic escape; rides through landscapes of dream, continuations, etc. Then, a song of extreme softness, pointing out the atmosphere of night will rise out of this tumult to create an idyllic environment. The furious agreements of the beginning will bring back to reality soloist and orchestra for an increasingly disheveled final conclusion." (Tomasi assoc.)

There is other chamber music by Tomasi utilizing the clarinet. He composed two woodwind quintets (1925 and 1952) in addition to the 1963 reduction of the Cinq Danses Profanes et Sacrees. There are Trois Divertissements for four clarinets, a Corsican Song that may be performed on clarinet (the instrument is not specified), wind trios, and a piece for clarinet, flute and harp. The works for clarinet by Tomasi have been relegated to the background of this oeuvre but they deserve to be performed with more regularity.

== Legacy ==
The biennial Concours International "Henri Tomasi" was launched in 2001. It is the only international competition held exclusively for wind quintets.

== Selected discography ==
- Tomasi : Complete Violin Works (Concerto "Périple d'Ulysse", Capriccio, Chant hébraïque, Poème, Tristesse d'Antar, Chant corse, Paghiella), Stéphanie Moraly (violin), Romain David (piano), Sébastien Billard (conductor), Orchestre de la Garde républicaine. Naxos 8.579091 (2022)
- Tomasi: Complete Works for Solo Piano, Emilie Capulet (piano). Calliope CAL2069 (2020)
- Tomasi : Requiem pour la Paix / Fanfares liturgiques, Michel Piquemal (conductor), Marseille Philharmonic Orchestra. Naxos 8.554223 (1998)

== Selected filmography ==
- Coral Reefs (1939)
- The Corsican Brothers (1939)
- The Island of Love (1944)
- Colomba (1948)
