= Blanka Teleki =

Hungarian women's rights activist

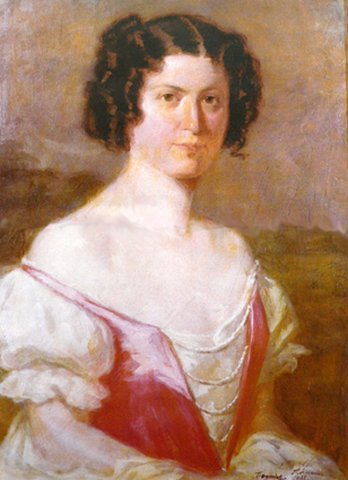
Blanka Teleki

Countess Blanka Teleki de Szék (5 July 1806 – 23 October 1862) was a Hungarian noblewoman, educator and women's rights activist. She is regarded as an early feminist and pioneer in the education of women.

== Life ==
Blanka Teleki was born on 5 July 1806 in Satulung in what is now Romania to Count Imre Teleki de Szék (1782-1848) and Countess Karoline Brunswick von Korompa (1782-1843). Her family had an estate in Satu Mare County near Ukraine. She was the niece of the education pioneer Teréz Brunszvik. She studied painting in München and Paris, and sculpture under István Ferenczy in Budapest. After having published her ideas regarding women's education, she founded her own school for girls in Budapest in 1846. In 1848, she and her pupils became the first females in Hungary to sign a petition demanding equal rights for men and women in Hungary, demanding women suffrage and the right for women to attend university. She participated in the Revolution of 1848, and was therefore sentenced to imprisonment. In 1851 she was imprisoned with Klára Leövey, who was released in 1856. After having served her sentence, she left Hungary for Paris and died there on 23 October 1862.
