= Mária Földes =

Hungarian-Romanian playwright

Mária Földes (5 September 1925 – 21 August 1976) was a Hungarian-Romanian playwright. After surviving several Nazi concentration camps during 1944–1945 in World War II, including Auschwitz, she returned to Romania, where she studied drama and theater arts. Writing several plays in Hungarian, she is also known for her memoir, The Stroll (1974), published in Hungarian and in Hebrew (1975).

== Early life and education ==
Mária Földes was born to a Jewish Hungarian family in Arad, Romania on 5 September 1925. She grew up speaking Hungarian, Romanian, and German. From the age of ten, she studied at the Notre Dame de Sion nunnery in Satu Mare, where she studied in French. In 1940, she was forced to enlist in the newly established Jewish gymnasium in Cluj due to the numerus clausus against Jewish students in all other schools.

In May 1944, after graduating from the gymnasium, Földes at the age of 18 was interned in the Cluj ghetto, where the Nazi occupiers forced the local Hungarian authorities to gather the Jews. She and her mother were deported some time during May 1944 from the ghetto to Auschwitz. Later, they were shifted to other concentration camps, such as Krakow-Plosow, Wiesau, and Langenbialau, where they were liberated by the Soviets. They both survived and returned home in May 1945.

== Career ==
After the war, Földes returned to Romania. She studied drama at the István Szentgyörgyi Academy of Dramatic Art in Cluj. Soon thereafter she began writing plays.

Földes wrote and published several plays, including:

- Weekdays
- The Demoiselle in the Barracks
- The Accident on Street Number Nine
- The Seventh is the Traitor
- The Inheritance
- Short is the Summer

With the exception of Short is the Summer, her plays were collected and published in a 1968 book titled "The Seventh is the Traitor". In 1974, Földes published her memoir, "The Stroll", in Hungarian in Cluj at Criterion Publishing House. That same year Földes left Romania as a dissident and rejoined both her children who lived in Israel.

Földes published a few short stories in various Israeli newspapers. In 1975, her memoir The Stroll was published in a Hebrew translation. It was adapted as a one-woman play by the same name, and received productions in Hebrew in Tel Aviv at the Habima Theatre, and a short tour in the United States.

The Stroll was published in a French translation in 2026. It drew immediate acclaim, with favorable notices appearing in Le Figaro and Le Monde, among many others.

== Marriage, family, and death ==
After the war, Földes married her school sweetheart Gabor Bartha, a documentary director, and in 1946 gave birth to their son, Gabriel Bartha. In 1948, she divorced her first husband and married Lazlo Földes, an adjunct professor at Babeș-Bolyai University in Cluj. She and her husband had a daughter, Agnes Földes.

Suffering from long-term depression, Földes committed suicide in 1976. Her daughter Agnes Lev worked with the actress Baatsheva to adapt her mother's memoir for the stage. They wrote a one-woman show, starring Baatsheva, which was produced at the Habima National Theater. She received the Kinor David (David's Harp Prize) for her performance.

The play toured in Yiddish and English productions. It was performed in the United States in 1977 or 1978. Földes' memoir was adapted in Hungary as a radio dramatization, produced in Budapest around 1985.
