= Stephen's Tower (Baia Mare) =

Tower in Baia Mare, Romania

Coordinates: 47°39′30″N 23°34′55″E

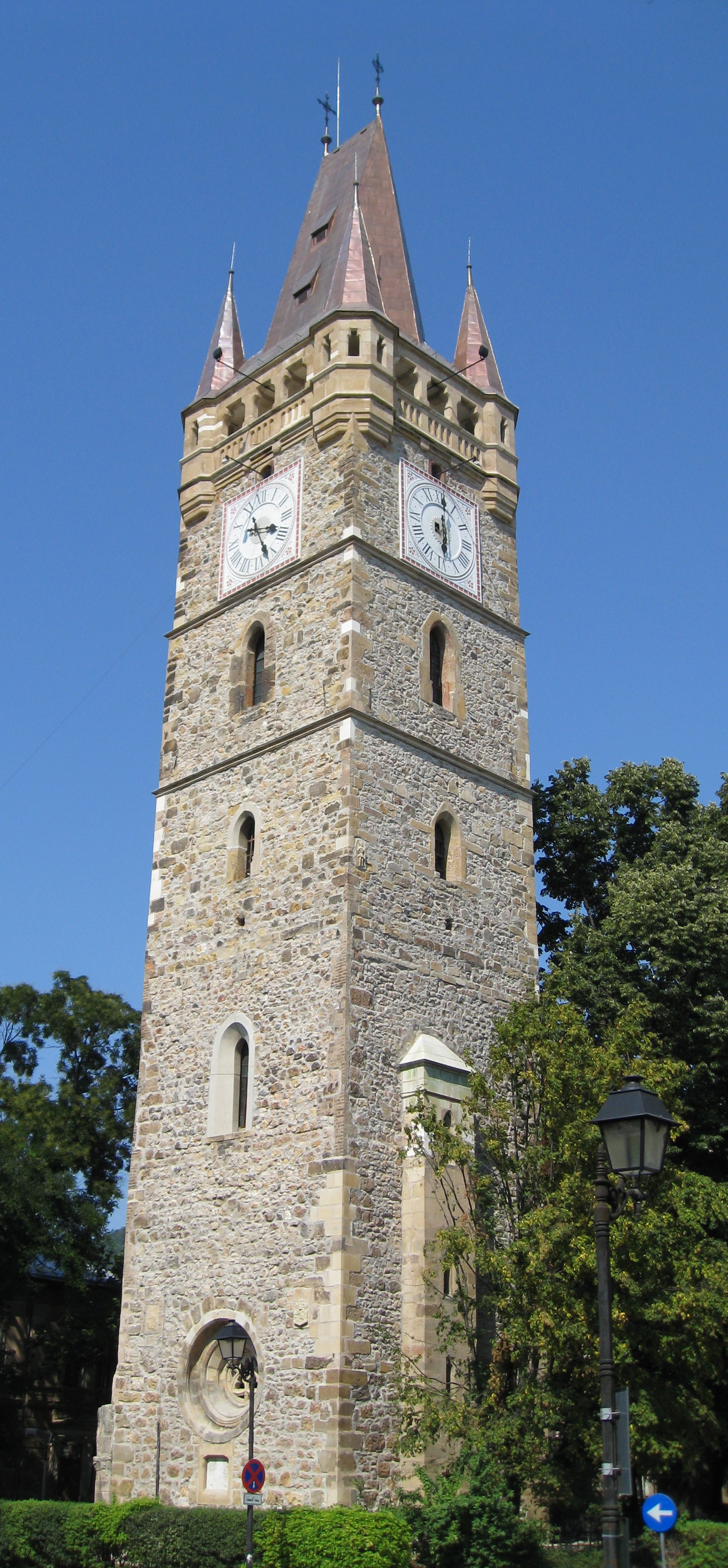
Stephen's Tower in 2008

Stephen's Tower (Romanian: Turnul Ștefan; Hungarian: Szent István-torony) is a tower located on Citadel Square in Baia Mare, Romania. Over 40 metres (130 ft) high and built in a neo-Gothic style, it is a symbol of the city.

Eventually used for strategic observation and detecting fires, Stephen's Tower was initially a bell tower for Saint Stephen's church, built in 1347–1376 as the only double-naved church in mediaeval northwest Transylvania. The church (50.6 m long and 19 m wide, with naves 25 m long), though not quite finished, was dedicated in 1387, when it was first mentioned as St. Stephen's. The bell tower was added in 1446 on the church's southwest side; it was begun during John Hunyadi's reign in honour of his 1442 victory over the Ottomans near the Ialomița River and completed in 1468 under his son Matthias Corvinus.

In the mid-16th century the tower and church were partly destroyed by powerful lightning. The tower was rebuilt in 1559–1561; the church passed from Roman Catholic to Reformed control in 1588. In 1619 both structures underwent a thorough restoration: the tower received a new roof, high and sharp-pointed, in the shape of a square-based pyramid. In 1628 four mechanical clocks with moons (one on each face), manufactured by a Prešov clockmaker, replaced the tower's bell. Another lightning-induced fire in 1647 devastated the church and tower. Yet another fire seriously damaged both structures when they were again hit by lightning in 1769. The tower was rebuilt the following year, when the gallery was raised a level and the roof redone in Baroque onion-dome style. The church was in ruins and repairs estimated to be very costly, so the authorities decided to demolish its remaining walls in 1847 using gunpowder; the former church site became a park in 1856, with Ferenc Schulz's 1870 plan for rebuilding it remaining unimplemented, and only the bell tower remained standing. This was destroyed by fire in 1869 and rebuilt in 1898–1899 in neo-Gothic style, a form it preserves to this day.

The aged light green slate roof was damaged by a storm in 2007; repairs, finished the following year at a cost to the city of some €200,000, included its replacement with a copper roof. The tower is open to visitors.

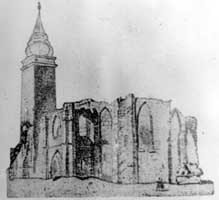
The tower in its Baroque form in 1847, with the church ruins

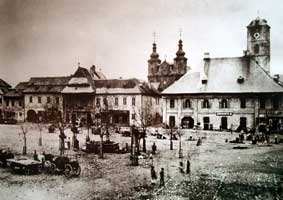
The tower after its fourth fire in 1869

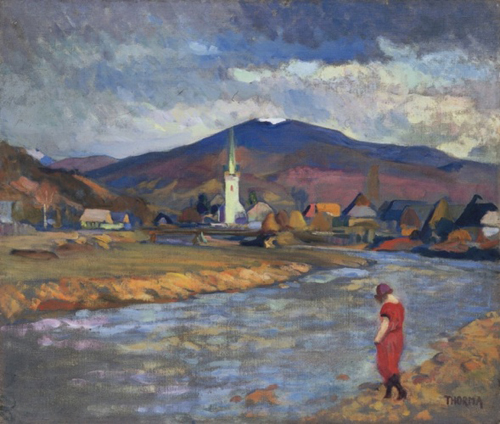
In a painting (ca. 1930) by János Thorma

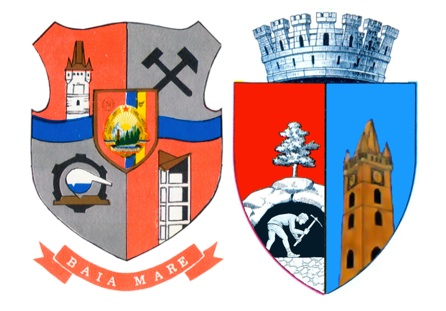
The tower, on both the city's Communist-era and present-day coat of arms

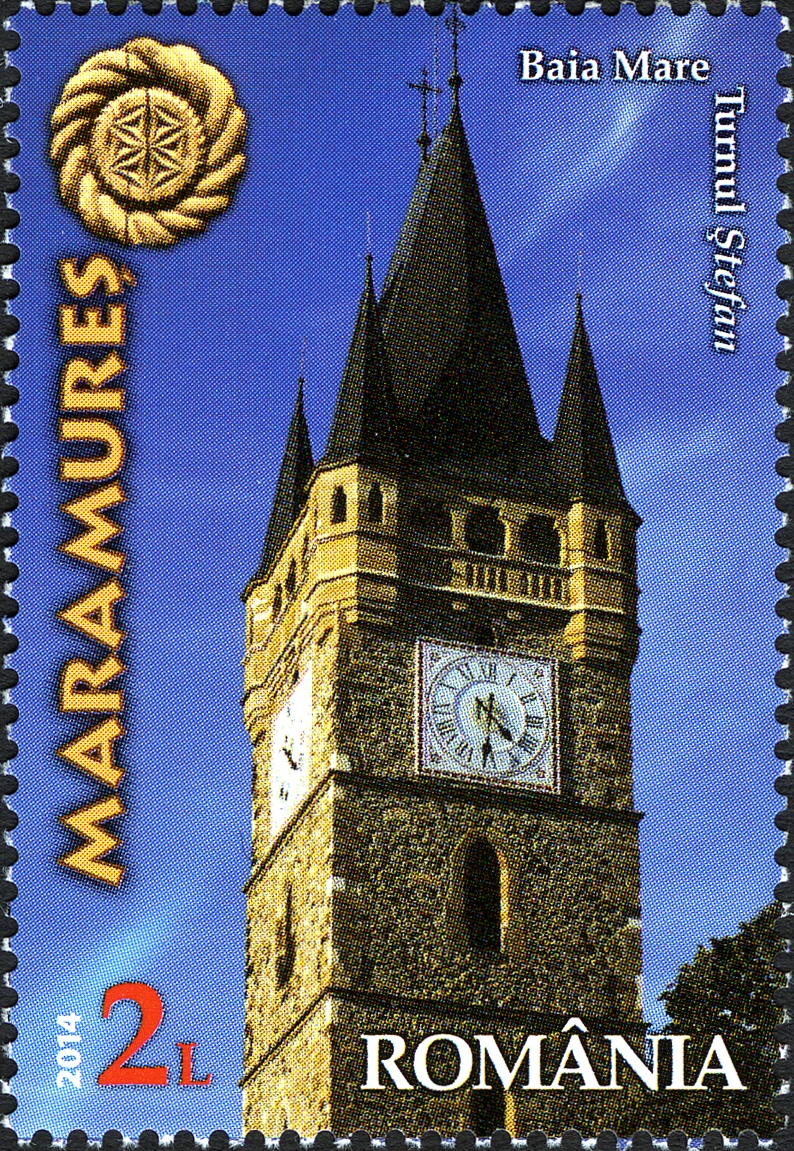
the tower on a 2014 postage stamp
