= Dora Cojocaru =

Romanian composer

Dora Cojocaru (born 20 August 1963 in Baia Mare) is a Romanian composer.

Cojocaru studied at the Gheorghe Dima Music Academy in Cluj-Napoca and obtained diplomas in composition, pedagogy and piano there in 1986. After studying with Johannes Fritsch at the Hochschule für Musik Köln, she was awarded a master's degree in composition. In 1997, she obtained a Ph.D. in musicology with a thesis on György Ligeti. After publication in 1999, the work was awarded the prize of the Romanian Composers' Union.

From 1990 to 2002, Cojocaru taught at the Music Academy of Cluj-Napoca, and from 1993 to 1995 she worked for the Westdeutscher Rundfunk. She has been living in Montreal since 2002 and teaches at different music institutions.

== Work ==
- Structuri for orchestra, 1985
- Luci, soare, luci, cantata for choir and orchestra, 1986
- Bocet pentru Manole, cantata for vocal soloists and chamber ensemble, 1987
- Cantos ll for mezzo-soprano and clarinet, 1991
- Vitalitate! for string orchestra, 1991
- Poarta Soarelui for flute and percussion, 1992
- A3 for clarinet, piano and percussion, 1992 (CD: Hungaroton, Budapest, 1998)
- Trills, string trio, 1992
- String Quartet No. 1, 1994
- Riga Crypto si Lapona Enigel, Chamber Opera, 1994
- Concertare, trombone quartet, 1995
- Galgenlieder in der Nacht, chamber cantata after Christian Morgenstern for soprano and ensemble, 1995
- Fragmenti for trombone solo, 1996
- 5 Moments Efemere for wind quintet, 1996
- String Quartet No. 2 "...esser loro Padre, Guida ed Amico! - in memoriam A. Kaercher", 1996
- ...on revient toujours! for clarinet and ensemble, 1996
- Refrains for clarinet solo, 1997 (CD: Computer Music Production, Cluj, 2002)
- Qu.-Sax., Saxophone Quartet, 1997
- Trio Violinissimo, 1998
- Violinissimo for string ensemble, 1998
- Concerto for Percussion and Orchestra, 1999
- Dati-mi lampa lui Aladin, chamber cantata for soprano and ensemble, 1998 (CD: Computer Music Production, Cluj, 2002)
- The other side of silence for oboe, violin, viola and cello, 2001 (CD: GunPowderTower Studio, Sibiu, 2002)
- Concerto for oboe and strings, 2001 (CD: Sibiu, 2002)
- Transparencies for clarinet and ensemble, 2002
- Basel Concerto for trombone and chamber ensemble, 2002
- De doinit for flute and harpsichord, 2003
- Etudes oubliées, clarinets (bassoon) quartet, 2003
- Virelais et virelangues, chamber cantata for voice and ensemble, 2003
- Schattenspiel for oboe and cello (or clarinet), 2004
- Clopote si orgi for organ, two organ positives and tubular bells, 2004
- Venice for voice, flute, baroque cello and harpsichord (text after Friedrich Nietzsche), 2005
