= Maurice Franck =

French conductor, composer and music educator

Maurice Franck (22 April 1897 – 21 March 1983) was a French conductor, composer and music educator.

== Life ==
Born in the 9th arrondissement of Paris, Franck was one of the sons of Jules Franck, harp soloist at the Paris Opera, and Clémence Braun, a good amateur pianist. He married Marcelle Horvilleur, also a musician. Among his cousins were Geneviève Zadoc-Kahn, stage manager of the Musigrains concerts, and Suzanne Braun, ophthalmologist and wife of politician Louis Vallon. Franck studied at the Conservatoire de Paris with Marcel Samuel-Rousseau and Paul Vidal. He participated five times in the Prix de Rome, where he won the first Second Grand Prix with his cantata L'autre Mère.

From 1937 onwards, he directed a harmony class at the Conservatoire de Paris. Later, he became president of the Conservatoire's alumni association. At the same time, he taught at Studios Pleyel, Lycée la Fontaine and at the Beethoven Institute founded by Hélène Amiot, alongside other pedagogues such as Noël Gallon, Maurice Hewitt, Georges Jouatte, André-Lévy, René Maillard, René Leroy, Auguste Le Guennant and René Saorgin.

At the beginning of the war, Maurice Franck was taken prisoner and sent to an Oflag. He was released on 14 August 1941, but on his return to Paris, he was again arrested on 12 December 1941 in Paris, during the "roundup of Jewish intellectuals" and interned at Royallieu-Compiègne internment camp. There, he conducted a small amateur choir. He was quickly released, thanks to the action of his second wife, Marcelle Horvilleur, also a musician (whom he had recently married on 6 September 1941 in Paris), and with the help of certain artistic circles. including Henri Rabaud, who showed his voluntary commitment during the First World War, and his decorations for the War Cross and the Légion d'Honneur.

From 1946, he was conductor at the Paris Opera. As a composer, he is best known for his works of chamber music, and has also written some works of musical pedagogy.

Franck died in the 18th arrondissement of Paris in 1983.

== Works ==
- Music for the film La merveilleuse tragédie de Lourdes by Henri Fabert, 1933
- Trio d’anches for oboe, clarinet and bassoon, 1937
- Psaume XXVIII, premiered in 1945 by the Concerts Colonne
- Trois mélodies pour chant et piano, 1951
- Music for the film Que serais-je sans elle, 1951
- Music for the film Dolorès et le joli cœur by Georges Chaperot, 1951
- Quatre mélodies, premiered in 1957 by Suzanne Juyol
- Psaume XXVI for four mixed voices a cappella, 1955
- Thème et variations for viola and orchestra, 1957
- Fanfare, Andante and Allegro for trombone and piano, 1958
- Suite for harp, 1959
- Deuxième Trio d’anches for oboe, clarinet and bassoon, 1960
- Grambrinus, Opéra bouffe in 2 acts and 6 tableaux, 1961
- Suite for viola and orchestra, 1965
- Prélude, arioso et rondo for saxhorn, bass trombone or tuba and piano, 1969
- Prière for oboe and piano, 1984
- Atalante, opéra bouffe

== Musical teaching publications ==
- Vingt-huit leçons de solfège, 1951
- Quinze leçons de solfège à sept clés, 1964
