= Mining sludge =

Mining sludge is the waste product of alluvial mining, and in particular hydraulic sluicing. It has been particularly prominent in gold fields in Australia and California in the nineteenth century.

In the 1840s in California and 1850s in Australia, methods for extracting alluvial gold were developed which involved washing soil and gravel through sluice boxes using diverted streams and other water sources. The waste or tailings were released into the waterways forming large deposits of highly mobile sediment. This 'sludge' as it was generally termed, blocked the stream channels causing flooding and burial of land downstream.

The cyanide process also involved releasing sediment contaminated with cyanide, while other sludge deposits have a variety of contaminants used in the mining process.

Large areas of land were affected by sludge, particularly in Victoria, where a Royal Commission was established in 1858-9 to investigate and manage the problem. This resulted in a number of regulations and the construction of large stone-lined sludge channels to concentrate and divert the sludge away from settled areas and buildings. The towns of Bendigo, Ballarat, Castlemaine, Creswick and Maryborough have channelized streams running through them as a result.

Ultimately hydraulic sluicing was banned in 1904 as a result of the continuing environmental damage caused to waterways in places such as Omeo, and a Sludge Abatement Board was established to regulate and repair the problem.
