= Timeline of the COVID-19 pandemic in Romania =

Sequence of major events in ongoing COVID-19 viral pandemic in Romania

This article documents the timeline of the COVID-19 pandemic in Romania.

== Timeline ==
=== 2020 ===
==== February ====
- On 21 February, following the COVID-19 outbreak in Italy, the Romanian government announced a 14-day quarantine for citizens returning from the affected regions.
- On 22 February, the Romanian government announced several preventive measures which included the designation of five hospitals as isolation centers for new cases, purchase and placement of thermal scanners in international airports, and especially designated lines for passengers coming from areas affected by COVID-19 outbreak.
- On 25 February, new measures were imposed. Upon arrival on the Romanian territory, all asymptomatic travelers from the affected areas, respectively Hubei, the 11 localities in Italy, and any remaining passengers on the Diamond Princess cruise ship would be directly placed in Quarantine for a period for 14 days. The other people coming from the Lombardy and Veneto regions would enter voluntary isolation at home for 14 days, upon arrival in Romania.
- On 26 February, the Minister of Education and Research required schools to spread awareness about COVID-19.
- On 28 February, the Romanian Orthodox Church suggested that followers use their own spoons and avoid the traditional kissing of icons in church.

==== March ====
- On 2 March, more preventive measures were taken by the National Committee for Special Emergency Situations. Thus, citizens arriving from other provinces or cities in mainland China, other localities in Lombardy, Veneto or Emilia-Romagna regions of Italy, as well as areas and localities in South Korea and Iran not previously specified for institutionalised quarantine, enter 14 days of self-isolation at home immediately upon returning to Romania.

===== 8−13 March: Ban on public gatherings, school and border closures =====
- On 8 March, the Head of the Department for Emergency Situations, Raed Arafat, announced a ban on all indoor or outdoor activities involving the participation of more than 1,000 people (these numbers were subsequently changed, see below). These restrictions are valid until 31 March, when a new assessment would be made. After Northern Italy was put under quarantine on March 8, low-cost airline Wizz Air suspended all flights to Treviso and Bergamo until 3 April. Likewise, Blue Air cancelled all flights to and from Milan for 8 and 9 March. In the same day, flights from and to Italy have been suspended. In a press conference, Interior Minister Marcel Vela stated that if a school reports even a case, courses will be suspended throughout the school.
- On 9 March, officials announced the cessation of flights to and from Italy, at all airports in the country, until 23 March. On the same day, the National Committee for Special Emergency Situations has decided to close all schools in Romania, from March 11 until 22, with the possibility of extending the measure. All bus rides and rail transport to and from Italy were suspended from 10 to 31 March. The committee also decided to establish a series of obligations for food units and for public and private providers of passenger transport, such as frequent disinfection of surfaces, avoiding crowds in commercial spaces, frequent disinfection of the passenger compartment in the means of transport, etc.
- On 11 March, the Government published a list of fifteen guidelines regarding the "responsible social behavior in preventing the spread of coronavirus (COVID-19)". The authorities have imposed a ban on sports, scientific, religious, cultural or entertainment events with over 100 participants in closed spaces until March 31. Likewise, the public activities for museums were suspended until March 31.

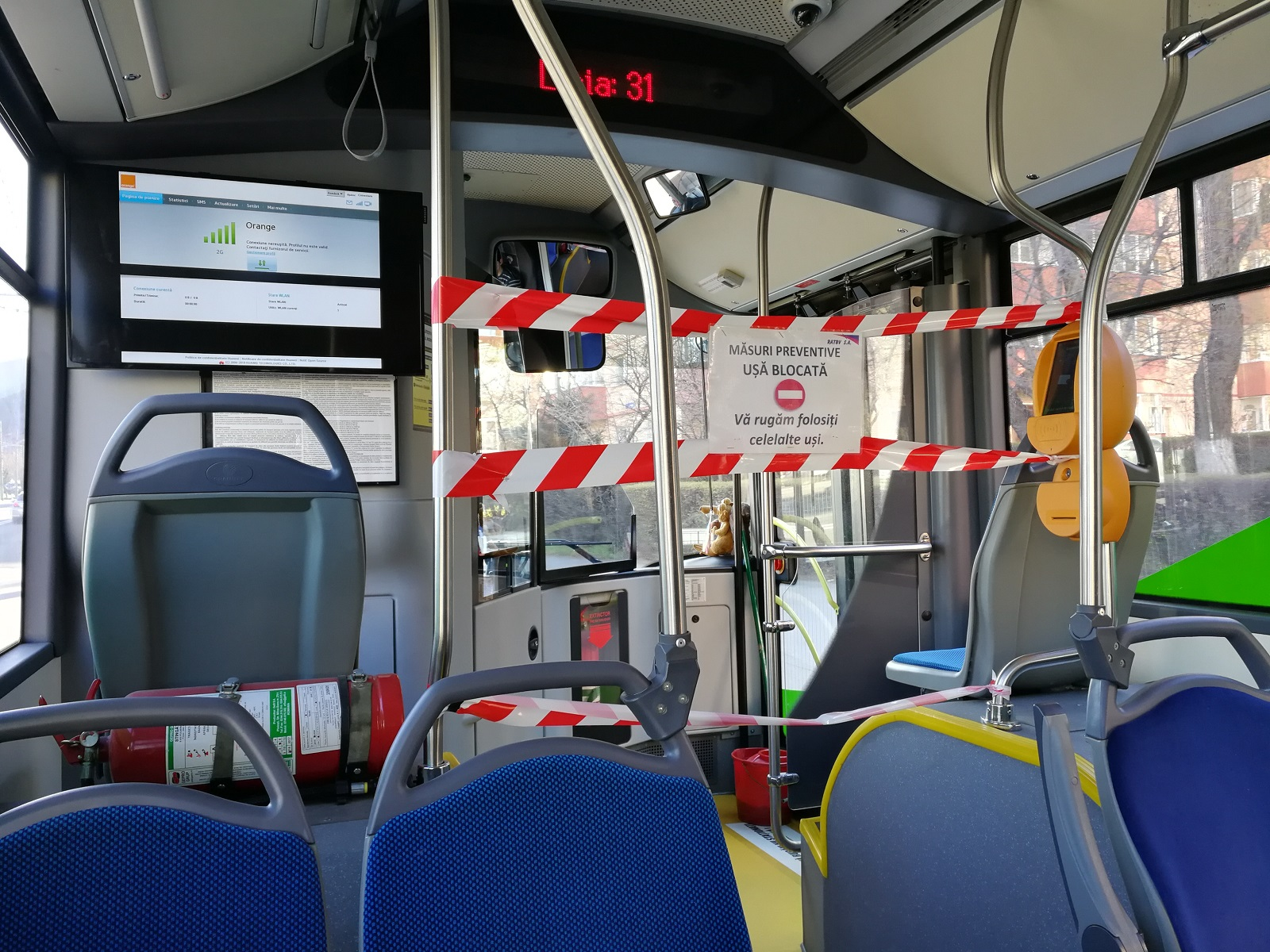
Barrier on bus to separate drivers from passengers in an effort to protect them from potential exposure to the COVID-19 virus

- On 12 March, Serbian authorities closed seven border points with Romania to prevent the spread of coronavirus. On the same day, the Romanian Ombudsman asked President Klaus Iohannis to declare the state of emergency and the Romanian Parliament to approve it. In a televised statement, the Secretary of State in the Ministry of Health, Nelu Tătaru, said that the current situation does not impose such an extreme measure. The Romanian Football Federation decided to postpone all football matches in Romania until 31 March. Interior Minister Marcel Vela announced that the border crossing points with low traffic have been closed so that employees there to be directed to high traffic posts. Health Minister Victor Costache issued an order prohibiting the export of medicines and medical equipment for six months.
- On 13 March, Vergil Chițac, former admiral, who acts as an independent in the PNL senators' group, was diagnosed with COVID-19. He isolated himself after finding out that a French parliamentarian, with whom he had been traveling to Brussels, was found with coronavirus. On March 9, Chițac attended a party meeting with over 100 people. Parliamentary sources claim that he was also present in the Senate on March 12, when he attended the group and plenary sessions. In these conditions, all members of the National Political Bureau of PNL self-isolated at home. Interim Prime-minister Ludovic Orban announced that all PNL senators have an obligation to isolate themselves and that he will self-isolate at Vila Lac 1. He also announced that all ministers will be tested for coronavirus and self-isolate.

===== 14−21 March: State of emergency =====
Number of cases (blue) and number of deaths (red) on a logarithmic scale.

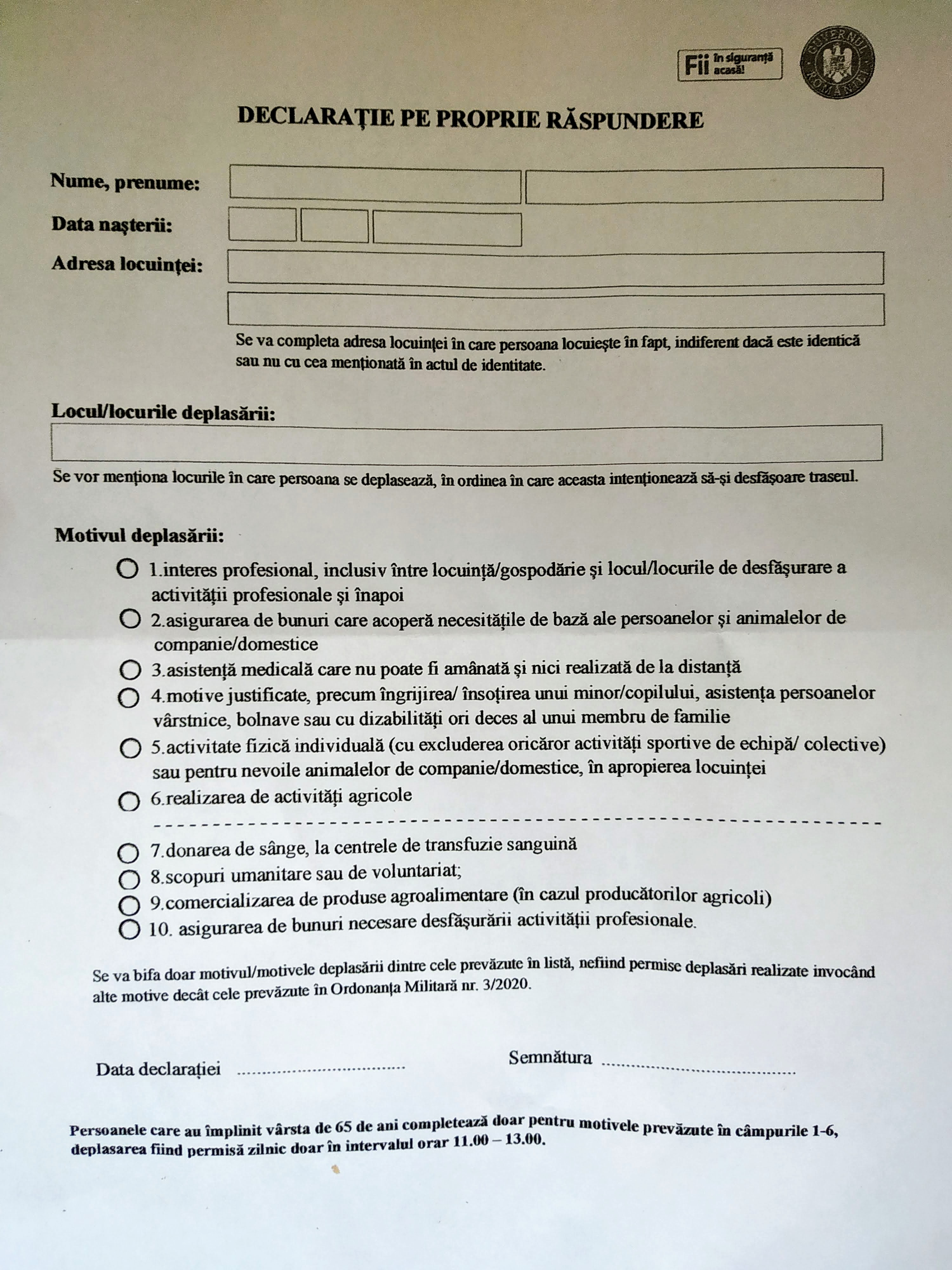
An example of a self-certification form used in Romania's coronavirus lockdown

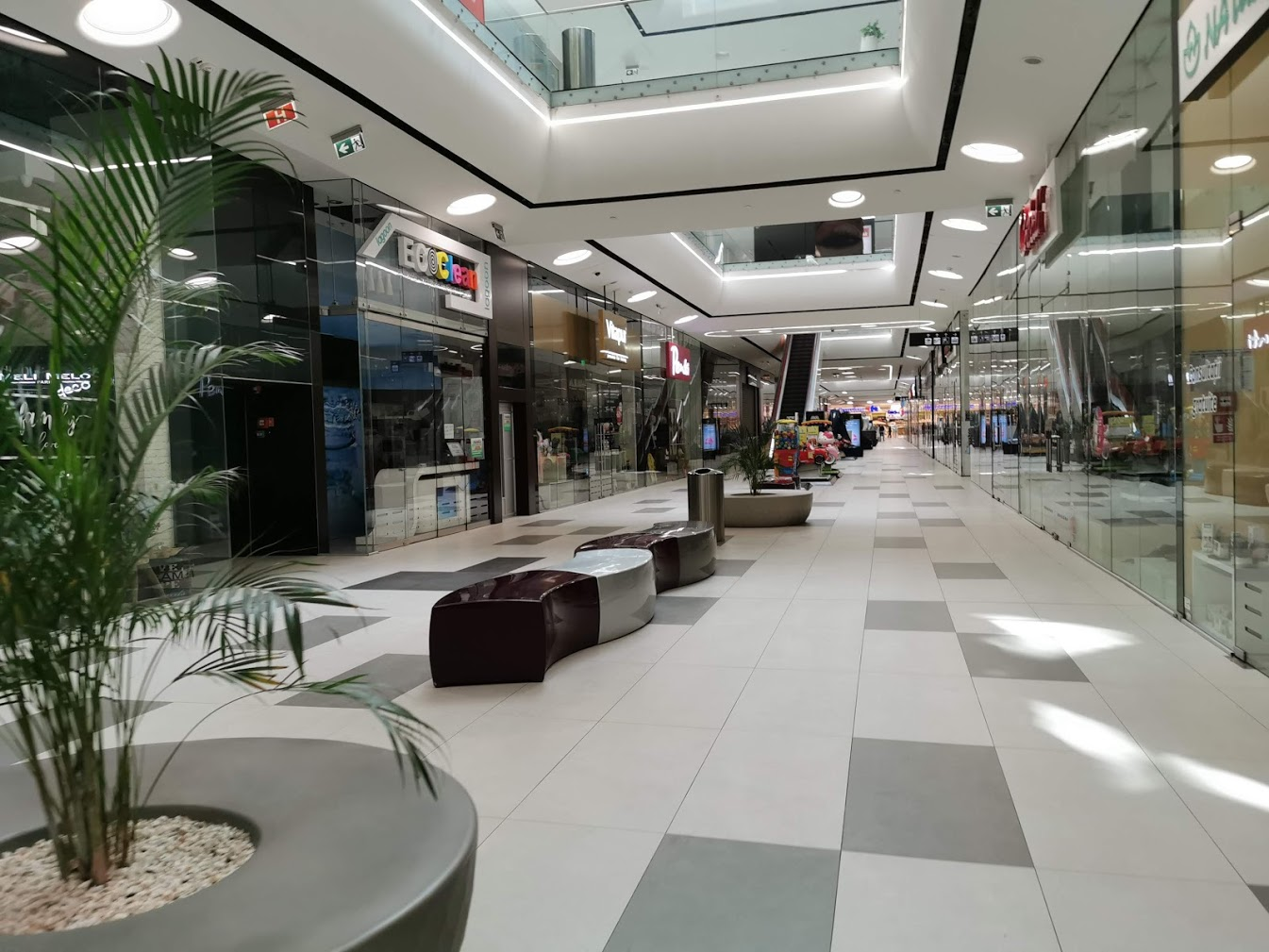
The Bucharest Mega Mall was temporarily closed to prevent the spread of COVID-19

- On 14 March, after over 101 people had been diagnosed with coronavirus, Romania entered the third COVID-19 scenario. The third scenario goes from 101 to 2,000 cases. In the third scenario the doctors will perform epidemiological screening in the tents installed in the hospitals' yards, and the hospitals of infectious diseases will treat only cases of SARS-CoV-2 infection. Likewise, the authorities will be able to impose quarantine at home, not just in hospitals, as in many areas the capacities of medical units could be exceeded. At the same time, according to the plan in the third scenario, public gatherings with more than 50 people are banned. Three more liberals have been diagnosed with COVID-19, all contacts of senator Vergil Chițac. Marcel Ciolacu, President of the Chamber of Deputies, announced that the Parliament will suspend its activity for a week. However, the activities will be carried out online. The same day, President Klaus Iohannis announced his decision to decree the state of emergency in Romania starting March 16.
- On 16 March, Iohannis issued the decree establishing the state of emergency in Romania for a period of 30 days and insisted that the implementation of the measures included in the decree is being made gradually. The schools will be closed during the state of emergency. If necessary, prices may be capped on medicines and medical equipment, on strictly necessary foods and on public utility services (electricity and heat, gas, water supply, sanitation, fuels, etc.). Also, gradual measures can be taken, if the situation gets worse, only after an evaluation of the National Committee for Special Emergency Situations. These include temporary closure of restaurants, hotels, cafes, clubs, gradual closure of borders, or limiting or prohibiting the movement of vehicles or people in/to certain areas. On 19 March, the Parliament convened a joint online session and unanimously adopted the decree issued by Iohannis.
- Until 17 March, the Ministry of Foreign Affairs facilitated the return to the country for 137 Romanians who were abroad, either as tourists, in transit, or in medical emergency situations and who were directly affected by the measures adopted by the states in which they were. Later that same day, the government issued its first Military Ordinance, in response to the ongoing health crisis. Four days later, on 21 March, a second Military Ordinance was issued: no groups larger than 3 people on the streets. Curfew from 10 p.m. to 6 a.m. All shopping centres were closed, except for the sale of food, veterinary or pharmaceutical products and cleaning services. It is forbidden for foreign citizens and stateless persons to enter Romanian territory, except through the specially organised transit corridor, further exceptions being made for other categories, such as residents, family members, and others.

===== 22 March: First deaths, national lockdown, Suceava quarantine =====
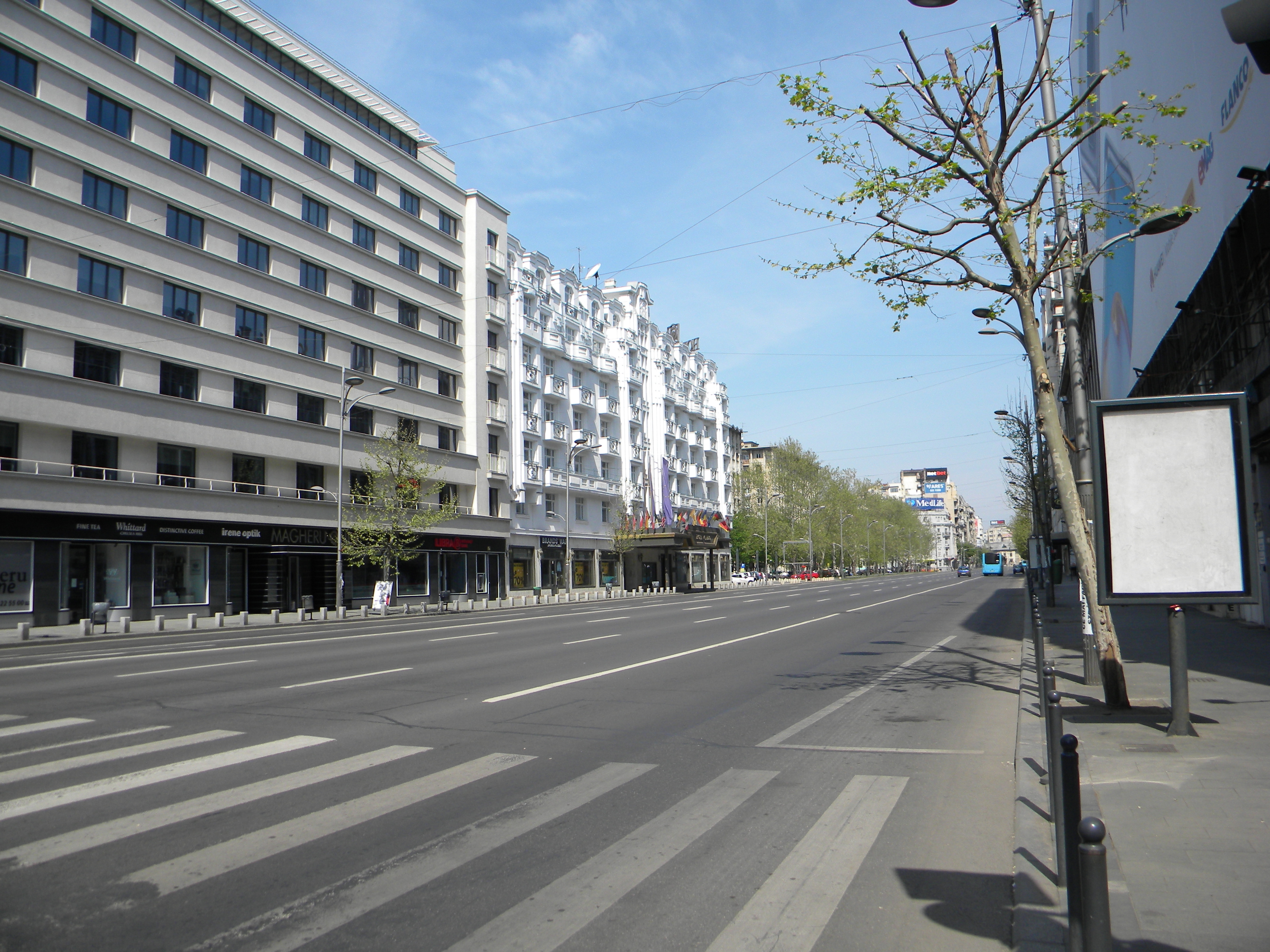
A nearly deserted Magheru Boulevard in Bucharest, 19 April.

- On 22 March, the first three deaths were reported in Romania. All three had preexisting conditions: one was on dialysis, one had terminal lung cancer, and one had diabetes. The next day, on 23 March, Suceava's main hospital, one of the largest in the country, reported at least seventy medical personnel infected with COVID-19, and 2 patients dying. Over the following days, their numbers would increase. The hospital director was dismissed, shortly thereafter, for mismanagement.
- Following a surge in new confirmed cases, on 24 March, the government announced Military Ordinance No. 3, instituting a national lockdown and calling in the military to support police and Gendarmerie personnel in enforcing the new restrictions. Movement outside one's home or household is prohibited, with some exceptions, such as working, and buying food. People over 65 were allowed to leave their homes only between 11 a.m. and 1 p.m. Two days later, on March 26, the state airline Tarom suspended all internal flights.
- A fourth Military Ordinance has been issued on 29 March, further strengthening previously imposed fines and restrictions. Two more would soon follow, issued close to the end of the next day; namely, a fifth, extending the ban on international travel, and a sixth, placing Suceava, along with eight adjacent communes, under total quarantine, the first Romanian city to be placed under complete lockdown since the start of the outbreak in late February, holding over a quarter of all infected cases, and about two thirds of all infected medical personnel. Some hospital staff have quit, others have signed a petition stating they "are sent to death barehanded".

==== April ====
- On 2 April, Harghita reported its first case, becoming the last county in Romania to report at least one case.

===== 4 April−14 May: Face masks, Easter Week =====
Police announcement during the Military Ordinance (Translation: Stay at home! Obey the Military Ordinance! Observe the rules and curfew schedules!)

- On 4 April, a seventh Military Ordinance was issued, further extending the national lockdown period, and imposing a second local quarantine on the town of Țăndărei, Ialomița County. On the same date, various counties and localities have started drafting local legislation requiring denizens to wear protection masks, whether professional or improvised. The next day, Raed Arafat posted an article on his official Facebook page, later picked up by the national media and other news outlets, encouraging citizens to wear protective masks, even if homemade. Prime minister Ludovic Orban, on the other hand, expressed doubts concerning not only the safety of homemade improvisations, but also about the necessary logistics for successfully implementing such a large scale operation, inasmuch as the demand would greatly outweigh the extant offer currently available on the market.
- On 7 April, a 53-year-old paramedic from Suceava became the first reported casualty among Romanian medical personnel. As of 18 April, there were over a thousand infected medical staff in the country.
- On 9 April, an eighth Military Ordinance came into effect, reinforcing previously adopted measures, prohibiting the export of certain basic foods, banning the commerce of majority share packages in the National Energetic System, recommending that residential buildings be equipped with sanitary products and that their stairways and elevators be periodically disinfected, and making provisions for various professional categories, such as fishing, apiculture, car service and dealership, the food market, pharmaceuticals, cross-border workers, social services, medical staff etc. A week later, on 16 April, a ninth Military Ordinance was issued.
- On 21 April, over 300 new cases, representing two thirds of the staff and patients of a local neuropsychiatric hospital, were reported in a village from Cornu Luncii commune in Suceava county, not belonging to those already placed under strict quarantine. On the previous day, Pimen Zainea, the Romanian Orthodox archbishop of Suceava, was flown into the Matei Balș Institute for Infectious Diseases in Bucharest, after testing positive for CoVID-19, where he would die a month later. Saint John the New Monastery has been placed in lockdown, and an epidemiological investigation was initiated.
- On 22 April, President Iohannis issued a press release, stating the government's intention to adopt, by mid-May, official legislation requiring citizens to wear surgical masks in public. That same day, Timișoara, Romania's third largest city, made the use of both facial masks and protection gloves mandatory in enclosed public spaces, including transportation. This decision came a week after Constanța, a major urban centre and one of the country's main tourist destinations, took similar measures on 15 April.
- On 27 April, the tenth Military Ordinance came into effect. Except for work and medical emergency, people over 65 were only allowed to leave their homes between 7 a.m. and 11 a.m. and between 7 p.m and 10 p.m. Two weeks later, on 11 May, an eleventh Military Ordinance lifted the Țăndărei quarantine. Two days later, a further Military Ordinance lifted the Suceava quarantine.
- On 14 May, a thirty-day state of alert was decreed, starting the following day, thus ending the stricter state of emergency, in force until that date.

==== December ====
COVID-19 vaccination in Romania started on 27 December. The first person to be vaccinated is Mihaela Anghel, a hospital nurse.

=== 2021 ===
==== January ====
Iohannis was vaccinated on 15 January.

==== 1−14 October: Fourth wave of cases ====
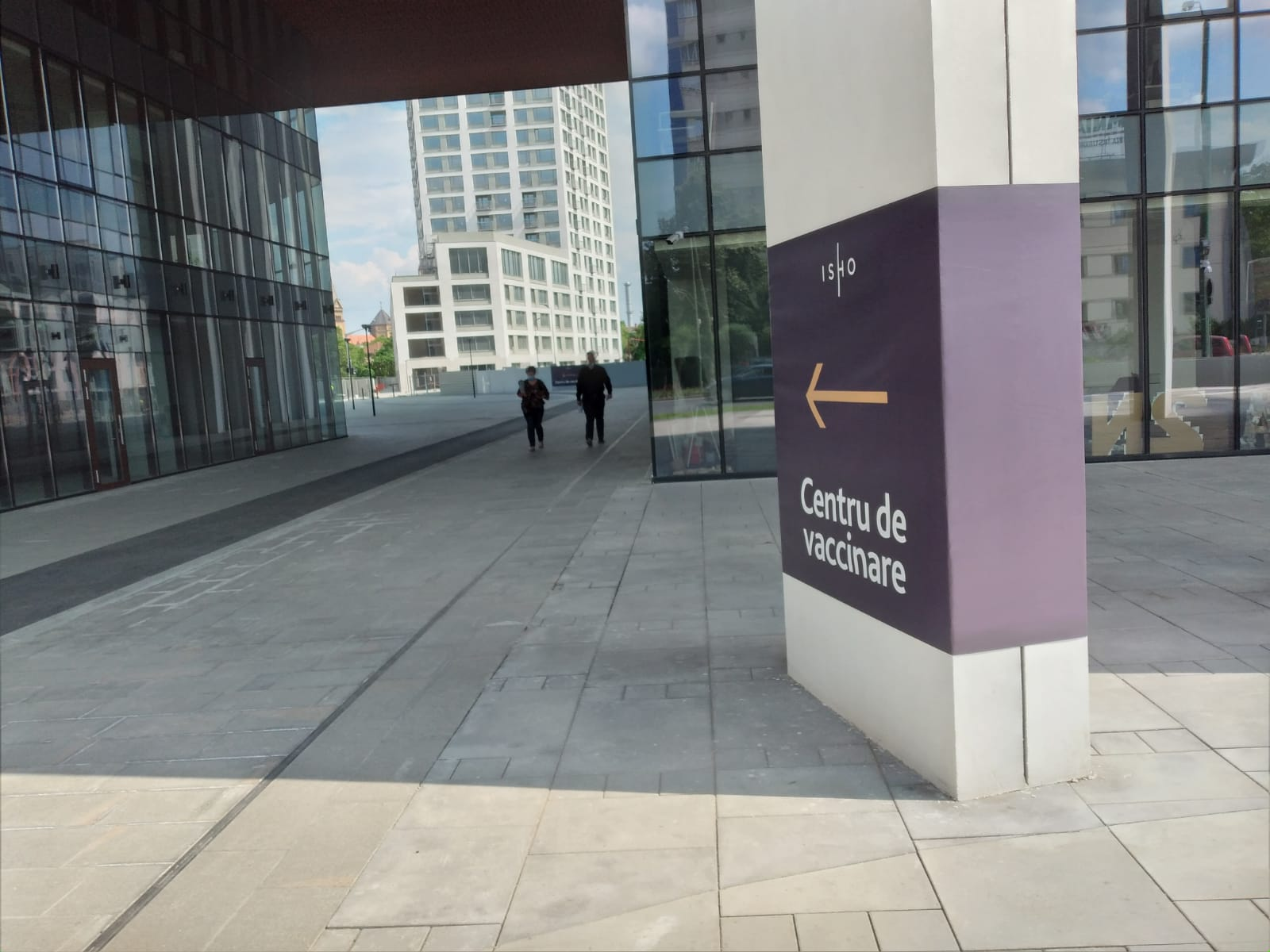
Vaccination centre in Timișoara (2021)

- The fourth wave was the most severe from all infection waves in the COVID-19 pandemic. Romania was among the member states of the European Union with the lowest percentages of vaccinated people, with only Bulgaria behind. Romania had been hitting record highs in the infections and deaths toll, and at one point (on 13 October 2021) even occupied the third place in new deaths and the fifth place in new infections worldwide.
- The pressure on the Romanian healthcare system that reached its maximum capacity in the fourth wave led to the authorities asking the European Union for help through its Civil Protection Mechanism.
- Despite the severity of this wave compared to others, the Romanian government had chosen to take a slightly more relaxed approach, unwilling to close the economy even partially in any way, shape or form. To avoid closures and radical restrictive measures, it had chosen to instead impose a digital green certificate requirement for some activities.
- Schools had been remaining open regardless of epidemiological situation, with Education Minister Sorin Cîmpeanu advocating strictly for the "close last, open first" strategy of school functioning. Schools would only close if at least half of its personnel and students were found infected, or at the directors' request. The Public Health Directorate (DSP) of Ilfov, one of the most affected counties by the fourth wave with an incidence rate of over 15/1,000 on 13 October 2021, set school closures countywide for at least 14 days starting 18 October, a decision severely criticized by Cîmpeanu, who was accused shortly afterwards by parents of ignoring health authorities.
- In localities with incidence rate over 6/1,000, face masks have been required in outdoor areas, while a night curfew was imposed. Vaccinated people wouldn't be affected this time by the curfew, which would apply between 20:00 and 5:00, and the unvaccinated was required to stay home and not go out for unessential tasks.

==== December ====
On 4 December, the Ministry of Health confirmed the first two cases of Omicron variant had been detected in the country.
