= COVID-19 pandemic in Romania =

- Disease: COVID-19
- Pathogen: SARS-CoV-2
- Location: Romania
- First outbreak: Wuhan, Hubei, China
- Index case: Prigoria, Gorj
- Arrival date: 26 February 2020 (6 years, 8 months, 3 weeks and 5 days)
- Confirmed cases: 3,604,919
- Severe cases: 903
- Hospitalized cases: 9,781
- Recovered: 1,899,522
- Deaths: 69,098
- Fatality rate: 1.92%
- Territories: Bucharest and 41 counties
- Vaccinations: 5,474,507 (total vaccinated); 8,114,769 (fully vaccinated); 16,827,486 (doses administered)

Government website
- www.stirioficiale.ro/informatii

The COVID-19 pandemic in Romania, a part of the worldwide pandemic, began on 26 February 2020 when the first case of coronavirus disease 2019 (COVID-19) caused by severe acute respiratory syndrome coronavirus 2 (SARS-CoV-2) in Romania was confirmed in Gorj County was confirmed.

As of 31 January 2022, the National Institute of Public Health reported around 2,200,000 cases, 1,800,000 recoveries, and 60,000 COVID-19-related deaths. More than 11.7 million RT-PCR tests and more than 7.3 million rapid antigen tests were processed.

An anti-COVID-19 vaccination campaign, part of a global effort to slow down the spread of the virus, started on 27 December 2020. As of 27 January 2022, over 50% of the country's eligible population had received at least one dose of the COVID-19 vaccine as part of an ongoing national vaccination campaign.

As of 21 January 2023, 16,102,916 COVID-19 vaccine doses had been administered in Romania.

== Background ==
On 12 January, the World Health Organization (WHO) confirmed that a novel coronavirus was the cause of a respiratory illness in a cluster of people in Wuhan, Hubei, China, who had initially come to the attention of the WHO on 31 December 2019.

Unlike SARS of 2003, the case fatality ratio for COVID-19 was much lower, but the transmission was significantly greater, with a significant total death toll.

== Timeline ==
=== 21 February – 2 March 2020: First cases, early preventive measures ===
On 21 February, following a COVID-19 pandemic in Italy, the Romanian government announced a 14-day quarantine for citizens returning from the affected regions.

On 22 February, the Romanian government announced several preventive measures including designation of five hospitals as isolation centres for new cases, purchase and placement of thermal scanners in international airports and specially designated lines for passengers coming from areas affected by COVID-19 outbreak.

On 25 February, new measures were imposed. Upon arrival on the Romanian territory, all asymptomatic travelers from the affected areas, respectively Hubei, the 11 localities in Italy, and any remaining passengers on the Diamond Princess cruise ship went directly to quarantine for a period of 14 days. The other people coming from the Lombardy and Veneto regions entered voluntary isolation at home for 14 days, upon arrival in Romania.

On 26 February, the Minister of Education and Research required schools to spread awareness about coronavirus. Two days later, the Romanian Orthodox Church suggested that followers use their own spoons and avoid the traditional kissing of icons in church.

On 2 March, more preventive measures were taken by the National Committee for Special Emergency Situations. Thus, citizens arriving from other provinces or cities in mainland China, other localities in the Lombardy, Veneto or Emilia-Romagna regions of Italy, as well as areas and localities in South Korea and Iran not previously specified for institutionalised quarantine, enter 14 days of self-isolation at home immediately upon returning to Romania.

=== 8–13 March 2020: Ban on public gatherings, school and border closures ===
On 8 March, the Head of the Department for Emergency Situations, Raed Arafat, announced a ban on all indoor or outdoor activities involving the participation of more than 1,000 people (these numbers were subsequently changed, see below). These restrictions were valid until 31 March, when a new assessment would be made. After Northern Italy was put under quarantine on 8 March, low-cost airline Wizz Air suspended all flights to Treviso and Bergamo until 3 April. Likewise, Blue Air cancelled all flights to and from Milan for 8 and 9 March. In the same day, flights from and to Italy have been suspended. In a press conference, Interior Minister Marcel Vela stated that if a school reported even a single case, courses would be suspended throughout the school.

On 9 March, officials announced the cessation of flights to and from Italy, at all airports in the country, until 23 March. On the same day, the National Committee for Special Emergency Situations decided to close all schools in Romania, from 11 March until 22, with the possibility of extending the measure. All bus rides and rail transport to and from Italy were suspended from 10 to 31 March. The committee also decided to establish a series of obligations for food units and for public and private providers of passenger transport, such as frequent disinfection of surfaces, avoiding crowds in commercial spaces, frequent disinfection of the passenger compartment in the means of transport, etc.

On 11 March, the Government published a list of fifteen guidelines regarding the "responsible social behavior in preventing the spread of coronavirus (COVID-19)". The authorities have imposed a ban on sports, scientific, religious, cultural or entertainment events with over 100 participants in closed spaces until 31 March. Likewise, the public activities for museums were suspended until 31 March.

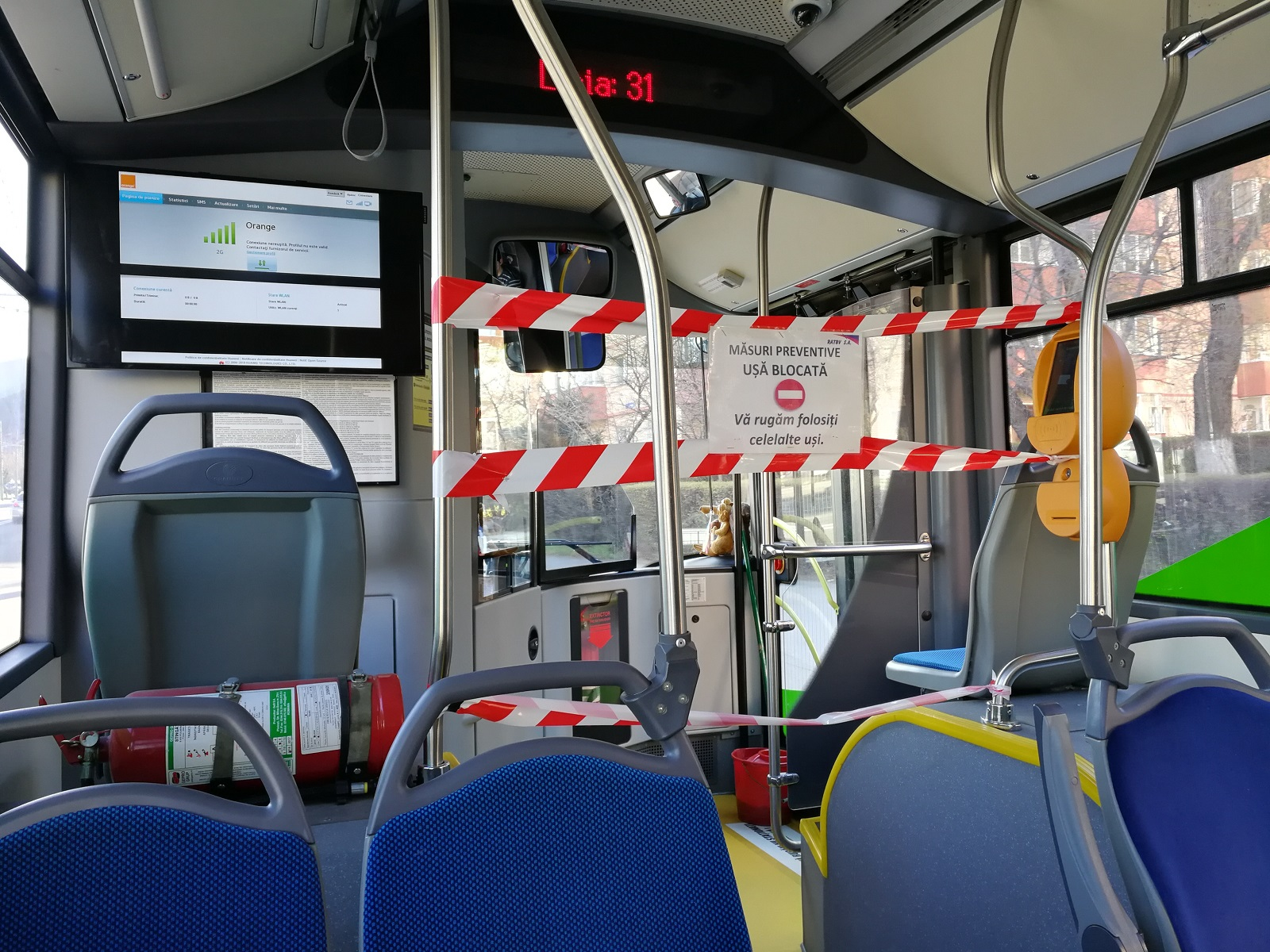
Barrier on bus to separate drivers from passengers in an effort to protect them from potential exposure to the COVID-19 virus

On 12 March, Serbian authorities closed seven border points with Romania to prevent the spread of coronavirus. On the same day, the Romanian Ombudsman asked President Klaus Iohannis to declare the state of emergency and the Romanian Parliament to approve it. In a televised statement, the Secretary of State in the Ministry of Health, Nelu Tătaru, said that the current situation does not impose such an extreme measure. The Romanian Football Federation decided to postpone all football matches in Romania until 31 March. Interior Minister Marcel Vela announced that the border crossing points with low traffic had been closed so that employees there to be directed to high traffic posts. Health Minister Victor Costache issued an order prohibiting the export of medicines and medical equipment for six months.

On 13 March, Vergil Chițac, former admiral, who acts as an independent in the PNL senators' group, was diagnosed with COVID-19. He isolated himself after finding out that a French parliamentarian, with whom he had been traveling to Brussels, was found with coronavirus. On 9 March, Chițac attended a party meeting with over 100 people. Parliamentary sources claim that he was also present in the Senate on 12 March, when he attended the group and plenary sessions. In these conditions, all members of the National Political Bureau of PNL self-isolated at home. Interim Prime-minister Ludovic Orban announced that all PNL senators have an obligation to isolate themselves and that he would self-isolate at Vila Lac 1. He also announced that all ministers would be tested for coronavirus and self-isolate.

=== 14–21 March 2020: State of emergency ===
Number of cases (blue) and number of deaths (red) on a logarithmic scale.

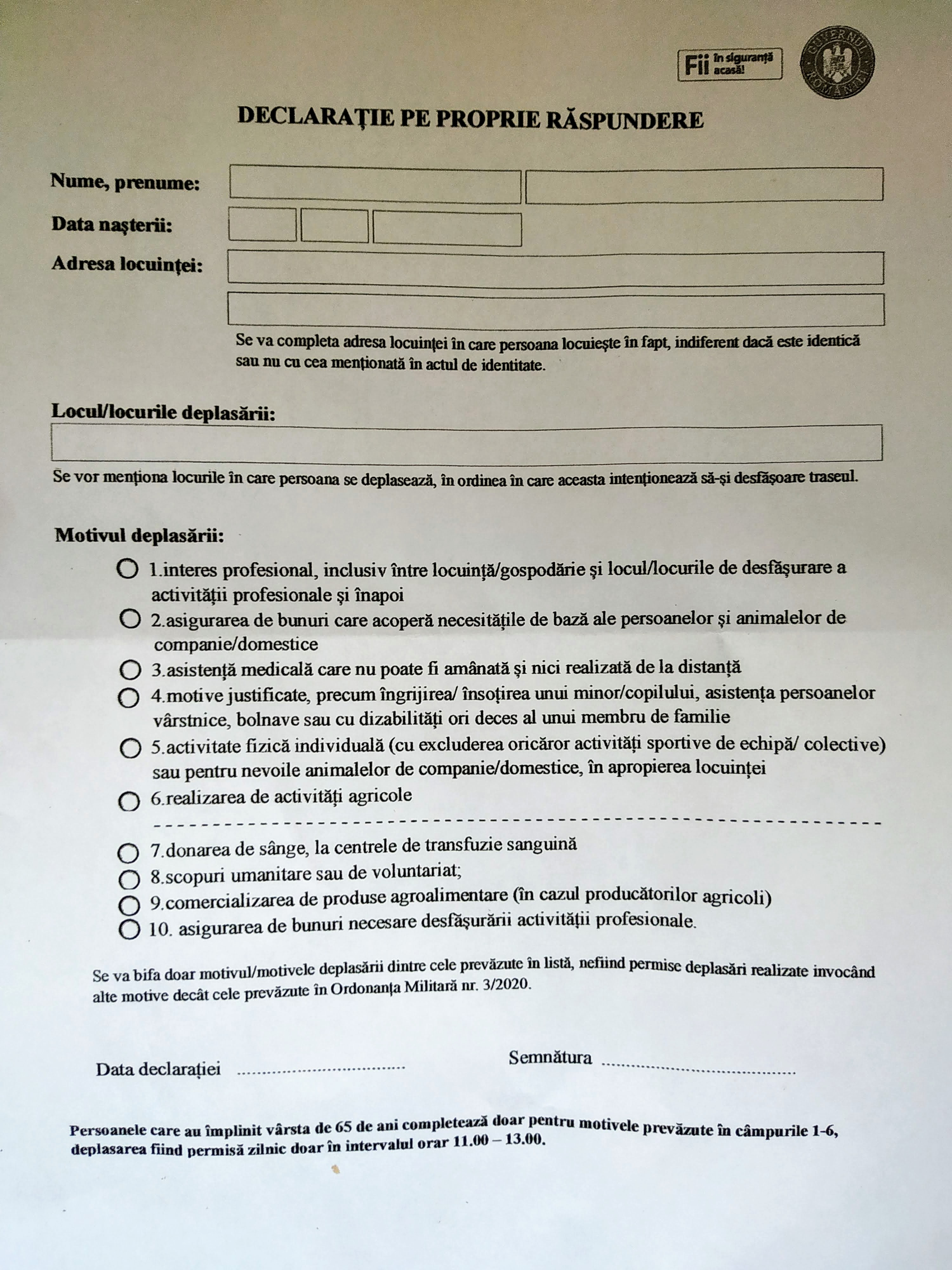
An example of a self-certification form used in Romania's coronavirus lockdown

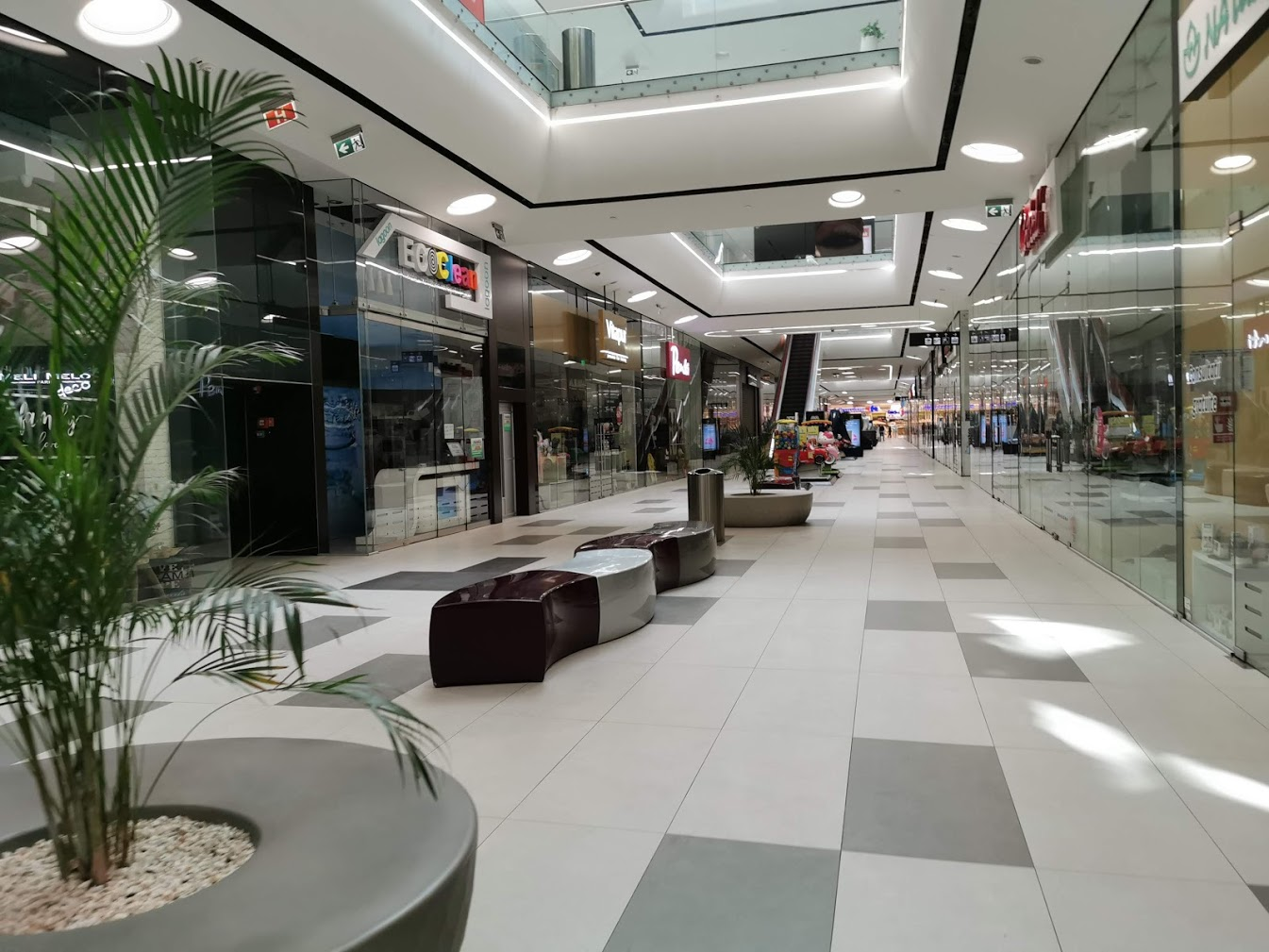
The Bucharest Mega Mall temporarily closed in March 2020 to help stop the spread of COVID-19

On 14 March, after over 101 people had been diagnosed with coronavirus, Romania entered the third COVID-19 scenario. The third scenario went from 101 to 2,000 cases. In the third scenario the doctors would perform epidemiological screening in the tents installed in the hospitals' yards, and the hospitals of infectious diseases would treat only cases of SARS-CoV-2 infection. Likewise, the authorities would be able to impose quarantine at home, not just in hospitals, as in many areas the capacities of medical units could be exceeded. At the same time, according to the plan in the third scenario, public gatherings with more than 50 people were banned. Three more liberals were diagnosed with COVID-19, all contacts of senator Vergil Chițac. Marcel Ciolacu, President of the Chamber of Deputies, announced that Parliament would suspend its activity for a week. However, the activities were carried out online. The same day, President Klaus Iohannis announced his decision to decree the state of emergency in Romania starting 16 March.

On 16 March, Iohannis issued the decree establishing the state of emergency in Romania for a period of 30 days and insisted that the implementation of the measures included in the decree was being made gradually. The schools were closed during the state of emergency. If necessary, prices may be capped on medicines and medical equipment, on strictly necessary foods and on public utility services (electricity and heat, gas, water supply, sanitation, fuels, etc.). Also, gradual measures can be taken, if the situation gets worse, only after an evaluation of the National Committee for Special Emergency Situations. These include temporary closure of restaurants, hotels, cafes, clubs, gradual closure of borders, or limiting or prohibiting the movement of vehicles or people in/to certain areas. On 19 March, the Parliament convened a joint online session and unanimously adopted the decree issued by Iohannis.

Until 17 March, the Ministry of Foreign Affairs facilitated the return to the country for 137 Romanians who were abroad, either as tourists, in transit, or in medical emergency situations and who were directly affected by the measures adopted by the states in which they were. Later that same day, the government issued its first Military Ordinance, in response to the ongoing health crisis. Four days later, on 21 March, a second Military Ordinance was issued: no groups larger than 3 people on the streets. Curfew from 10 p.m. to 6 a.m. All shopping centres were closed, except for the sale of food, veterinary or pharmaceutical products and cleaning services. It was forbidden for foreign citizens and stateless persons to enter Romanian territory, except through the specially organised transit corridor, further exceptions being made for other categories, such as residents, family members, and others.

=== 22 March – 2 April 2020: First deaths, national lockdown, Suceava quarantine ===
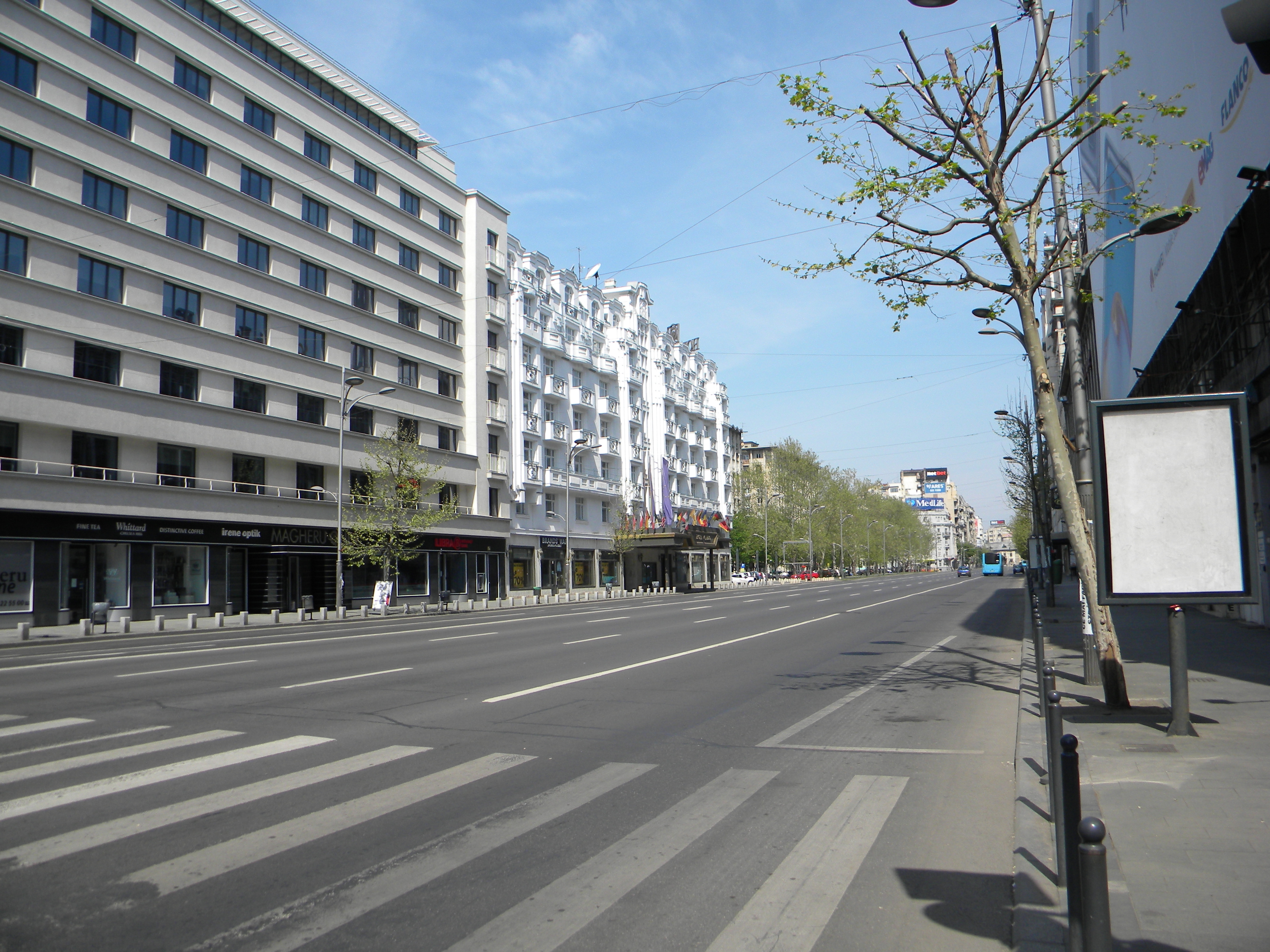
A nearly deserted Magheru Boulevard in Bucharest, 19 April 2020.

On 22 March, the first three deaths were reported in Romania. All three had preexisting conditions: one was on dialysis, one had terminal lung cancer, and one had diabetes. The next day, on 23 March, Suceava's main hospital, the Saint John the New Emergency County Hospital of Suceava, one of the largest in the country, reported at least 70 medical personnel infected with COVID-19, and 2 patients dying. Over the following days, their numbers would increase. The hospital director was dismissed, shortly thereafter, for mismanagement.

Following a surge in new confirmed cases, on 24 March, the government announced Military Ordinance No.3, instituting a national lockdown and calling in the military to support police and Gendarmerie personnel in enforcing the new restrictions. Movement outside the home or household was prohibited, with some exceptions (work, buying food or medicine etc.). People over 65 were allowed to leave their homes only between 11 a.m. and 1 p.m. Two days later, on 26 March, the state airline TAROM suspended all internal flights.

A fourth Military Ordinance was issued on 29 March, further strengthening previously imposed fines and restrictions. Two more would soon follow, issued close to the end of the next day; namely, a fifth, extending the ban on international travel, and a sixth, placing Suceava, along with eight adjacent communes, under total quarantine, the first Romanian city to be placed under complete lockdown since the start of the outbreak in late February, holding over a quarter of all infected cases, and about two-thirds of all infected medical personnel. Some hospital staff have quit, others have signed a petition stating they "are sent to death barehanded".

On 2 April, Harghita reported its first case, becoming the last county in Romania to report at least one case.

=== 4 April – 14 May 2020: Face masks, Easter Week ===
Prefabricated temporary hospital in Bucharest, Elias University Hospital

On 4 April, a seventh Military Ordinance was issued, further extending the national lockdown period, and imposing a second local quarantine on the town of Țăndărei, Ialomița County. On the same date, various counties and localities have started drafting local legislation requiring denizens to wear protection masks, whether professional or improvised. The next day, Raed Arafat posted an article on his official Facebook page, later picked up by the national media and other news outlets, encouraging citizens to wear protective masks, even if homemade. Prime minister Ludovic Orban, on the other hand, expressed doubts concerning not only the safety of homemade improvisations, but also about the necessary logistics for successfully implementing such a large scale operation, inasmuch as the demand would greatly outweigh the extant offer currently available on the market.

On 7 April, a 53-year-old paramedic from Suceava became the first reported casualty among Romanian medical personnel. As of 18 April, there were over a thousand infected medical staff in the country.

On 9 April, an eighth Military Ordinance came into effect, reinforcing previously adopted measures, prohibiting the export of certain basic foods, banning the commerce of majority share packages in the National Energetic System, recommending that residential buildings be equipped with sanitary products and that their stairways and elevators be periodically disinfected, and making provisions for various professional categories, such as fishing, apiculture, car service and dealership, the food market, pharmaceuticals, cross-border workers, social services, medical staff etc. A week later, on 16 April, a ninth Military Ordinance was issued.

On 21 April, over 300 new cases, representing two-thirds of the staff and patients of a local neuropsychiatric hospital, were reported in a village from Cornu Luncii commune in Suceava county, not belonging to those already placed under strict quarantine. On the previous day, Pimen Zainea, the Romanian Orthodox archbishop of Suceava, was flown into the Matei Balș Institute for Infectious Diseases in Bucharest, after testing positive for COVID-19, where he would die a month later. Saint John the New Monastery was placed in lockdown, and an epidemiological investigation was initiated.

On 22 April, President Iohannis issued a press release, stating the government's intention to adopt, by mid-May, official legislation requiring citizens to wear surgical masks in public. That same day, Timișoara, Romania's third largest city, made the use of both facial masks and protection gloves mandatory in enclosed public spaces, including transportation. This decision came a week after Constanța, a major urban centre and one of the country's main tourist destinations, took similar measures on 15 April.

On 27 April, the tenth Military Ordinance came into effect. Except for work and medical emergency, people over 65 were only allowed to leave their homes between 7 a.m. and 11 a.m. and between 7 p.m and 10 p.m. Two weeks later, on 11 May, an eleventh Military Ordinance lifted the Țăndărei quarantine. Two days later, a further Military Ordinance lifted the Suceava quarantine. On 14 May, a thirty-day state of alert was decreed, starting the following day, thus ending the stricter state of emergency, in force until that date.

=== 15 May – 13 September 2020: State of alert, relaxation measures ===
The state of emergency ended on 14 May and was replaced by the state of alert, starting with 15 May, when the hairdressing salons, barbershops, dental offices and museums were reopened. Leaving the city of residence was possible only with a statement and reason and those who return to the country were isolated at home. The malls with an area under 15,000 sq m were reopened.

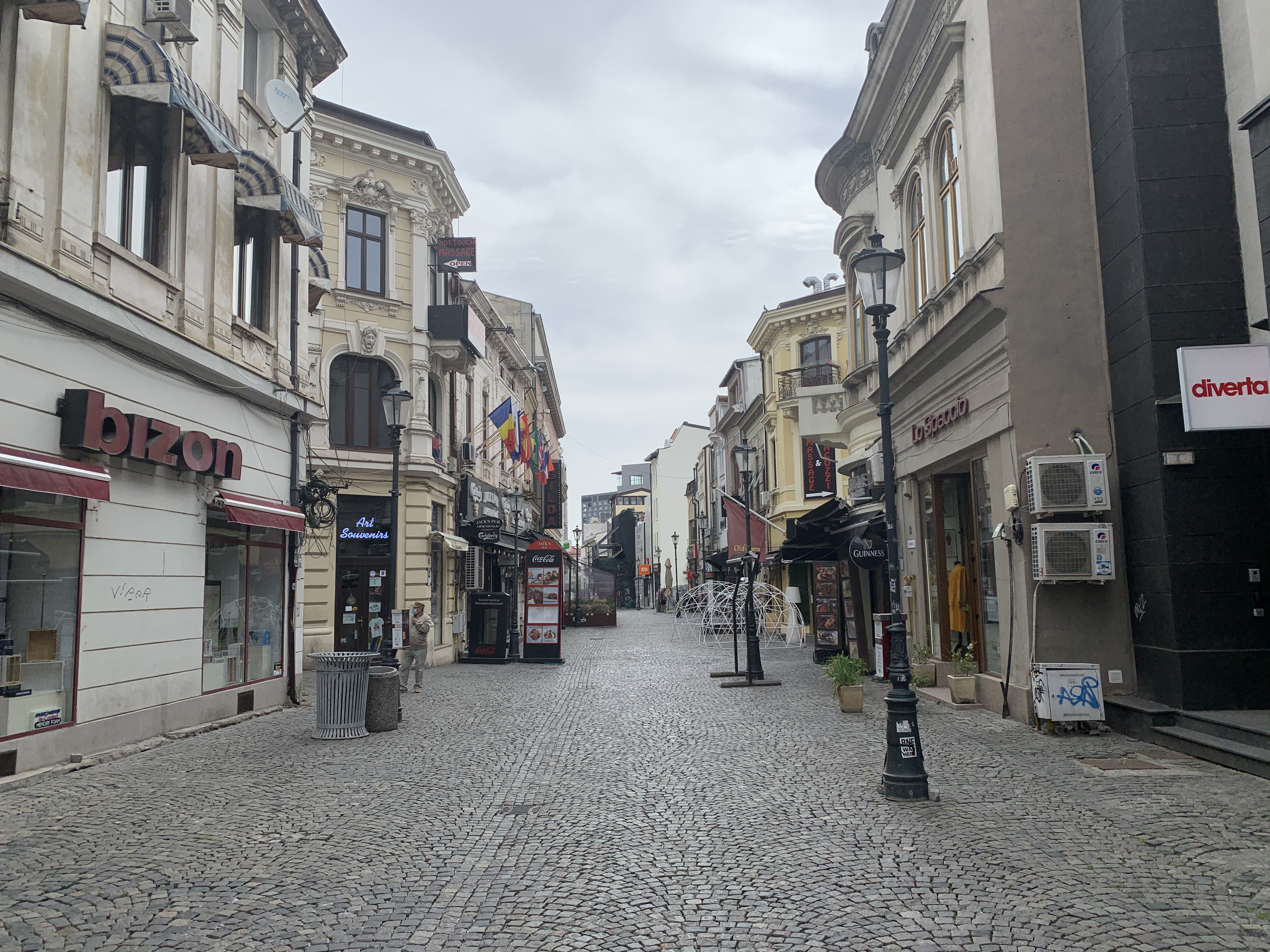
An empty street in the Bucharest Old Town, 22 May 2020

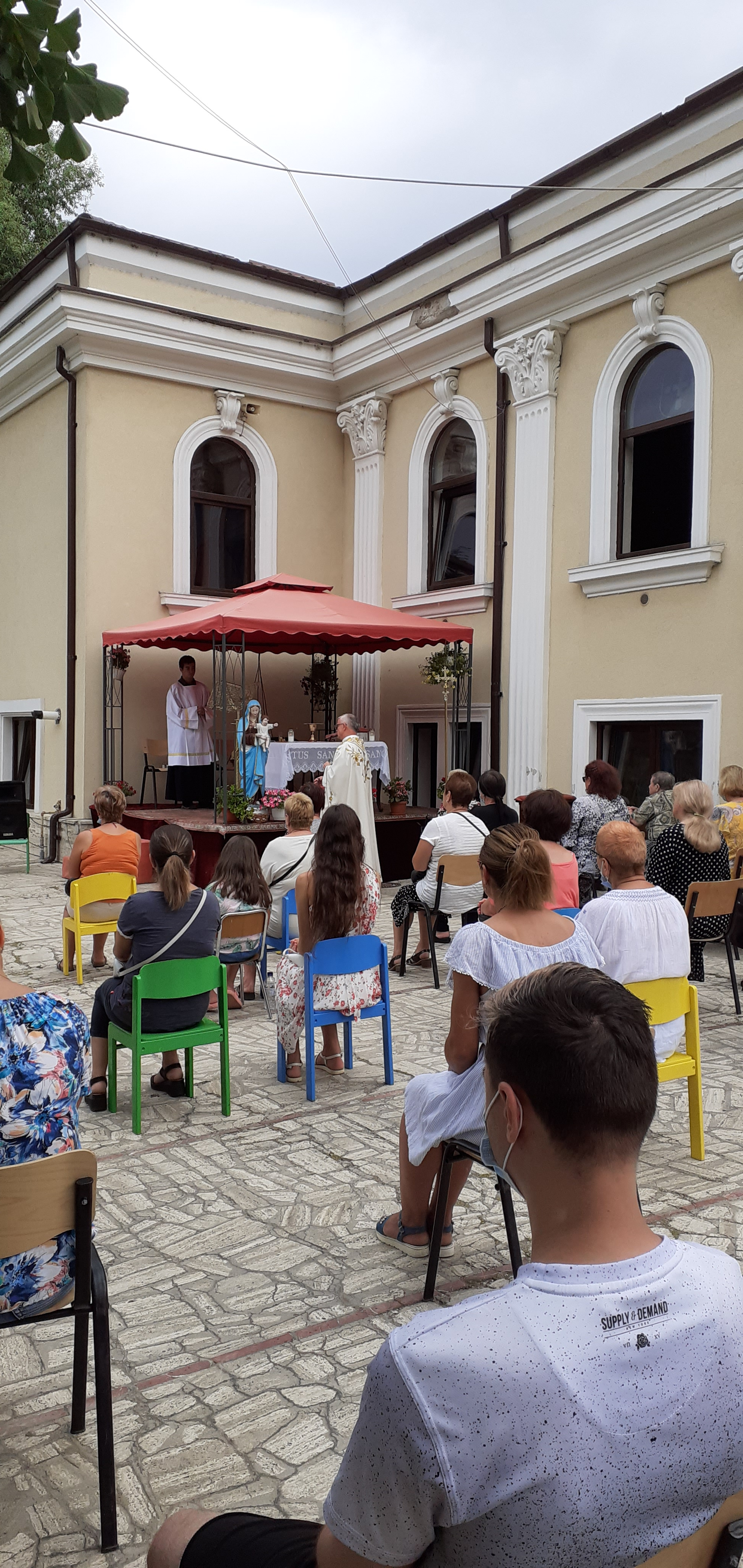
Social distancing at a Bucharest church, 15 August 2020

250 thousand Romanians donated for the construction of the most modern modular coronavirus hospital. The hospital was ready in two weeks.

Archbishop Theodosius of Thomis shared several children using the same teaspoon and the same chalice, defying the rules imposed by the authorities and the Holy Synod.

New sanctions from 1 July: suspension of the operating license for organisers of activities and events that do not comply with anti-COVID rules.

Images with dozens of people singing and dancing, in Vama Veche, without taking into account the distance rules imposed due to the COVID-19 pandemic, have appeared on social networks. The administrator of a club, fined 2,000 lei.

Two PSD deputies – Adrian Solomon and Irinel Stativa – refused to wear a mask in a fast food restaurant in sector 3 and quarreled with the police were fined and for not wearing a protective mask, according to the law on alert status . The announcement was made by the Capital Police, which states that in the meantime the images captured by the video cameras in the place were viewed. Parliamentarians were initially fined for causing a scandal.

The state of alert in Romania extended by 30 days, President Klaus Iohannis announced. He said no new restrictions would be imposed, but there would be no new easing measures.

The new restrictions that came into force on 1 August: The protective mask was mandatory in open spaces, at certain time intervals, which were set by the county authorities, and the premises with terrace were open only until 23.00. Specifically, "the sale and consumption of food, alcoholic and non-alcoholic beverages in specially designated areas between 23.00 and 06.00 will be prohibited". The gambling halls were also be closed at the same time.

The National Committee for Emergency Situations adopted Decision number 43 which provided for the reopening starting with 1 September 2020 of restaurants and cafes inside buildings, including in the case of accommodation units, the limitation at national level of the operation of terraces between 06.00- 24.00 and increasing the number of people who can participate in private events to 50 in an enclosed space, respectively 100 in an open space. However, the clubs and discos inside remained closed.

The Ministry of Health published the epidemiological analysis by counties and localities which shows the incidence rate of coronavirus infections per thousand inhabitants, essential data for the beginning of the new school year. The epidemiological criterion based on which the educational units / institutions establish one of the 3 scenarios was the cumulative incidence rate, respectively the total number of new cases in the last 14 days compared to 1000 inhabitants: Scenario 1 – green – school starts with the physical presence of all students – Incidence rate less than 1 per thousand inhabitants; Scenario 2 – yellow – hybrid scenario – Only students in grades VIII and XII participated physically daily in classes, while the rest of the students returned partially (by rotation every 1–2 weeks). Incidence rate between 1 and 3 per thousand inhabitants; Scenario 3 – red – Online school only – Incidence rate higher than 3 per thousand inhabitants.

=== 6 November 2020 – 7 February 2021: Partial lockdown, legislative elections, vaccination campaign ===
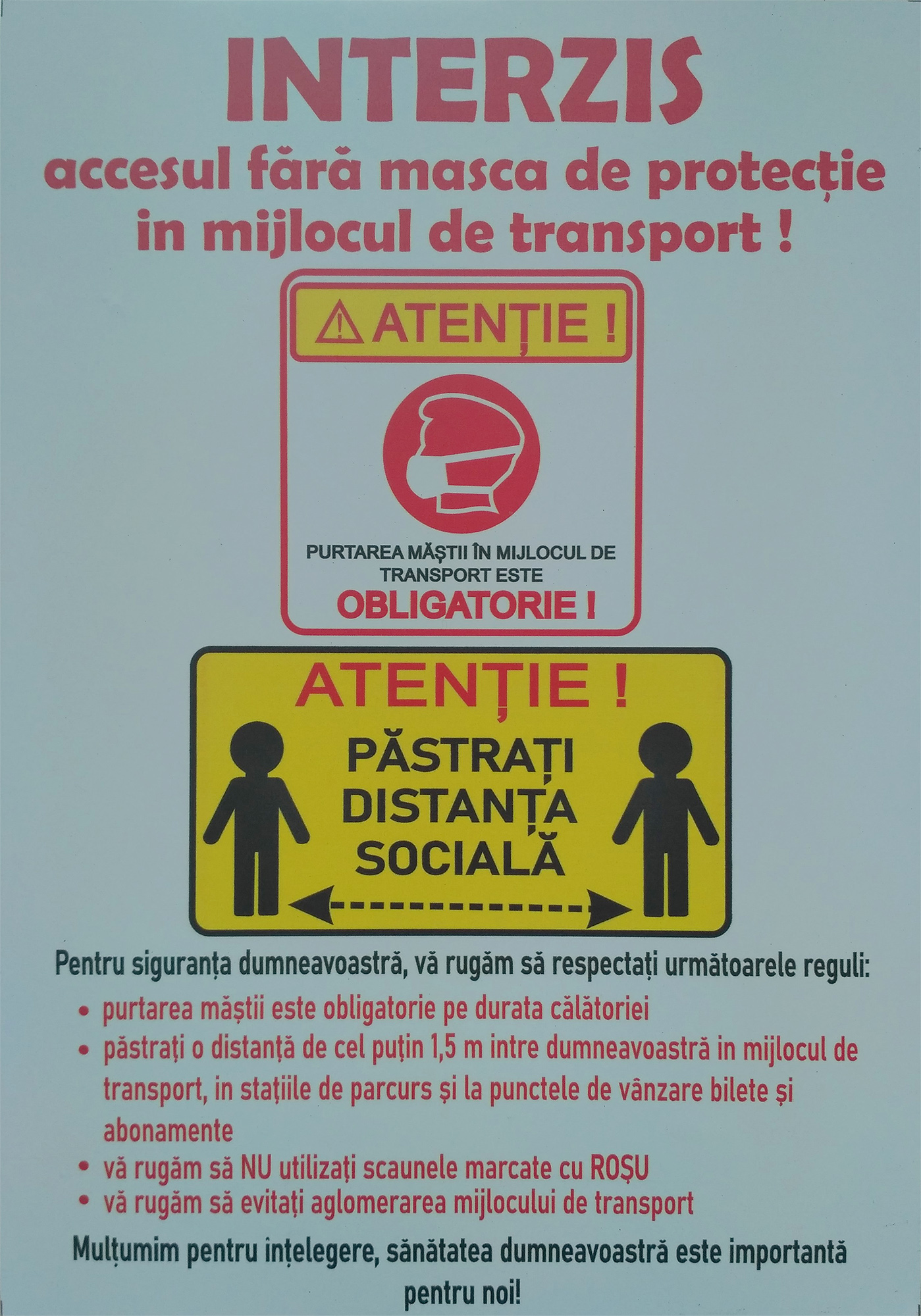
Social distancing sign at a bus stop in Cluj-Napoca. Translation: Access without a protective mask to the means of transport is prohibited. Attention! Wearing the mask in the means of transport is mandatory! Keep your social distance. For your own safety, please observe the following rules: - wearing a mask is mandatory during the trip. - keep a distance of at least 1.5 m between you in the means of transport, in the stations and at the points of sale of tickets and season tickets - please do not use the seats marked in red - please avoid congestion in the means of transport. Thank you for understanding, your health is important to us!

The resurgence in new infections, hospitalisations and deaths have resulted in imposing of new restrictions that took effect on 9 November. They included the closure of schools, a curfew between 23:00 and 5:00, the requirement of wearing face masks in both open and closed areas nationwide, and the closure of agri-food markets in closed areas. Remote work was encouraged where possible. Leaving the home or household during the curfew was prohibited, with some exceptions, while only gas stations, pharmacies, and economical operators with home delivery activities were allowed to operate after 21:00.

The Romanian authorities were criticised for not delaying the 2020 legislative elections past 6 December, as well as for the closure of agri-food markets and the lack of testing compared to other European countries. They've defended their decisions by saying that "democracy cannot be put in parentheses", that "agri-food markets in closed areas are super-spreaders", and that "there are no requests for testing". President Iohannis announced on 2 December that agri-food markets in closed areas would reopen beginning "the end of the current week (at the time of the issuing of the press release)".

On 27 December, at the same time as other member states of the European Union, in which Romania was a member of, the vaccination campaign had started, the process being divided into three phases.

On 28 December, the then-new Minister of Education, Sorin Cîmpeanu, announced the Ministry's intention to reopen schools starting 8 February, when the second semester would begin. This was conditioned by the evolution of the pandemic, if the number of new cases surged after the Winter holidays or not, as well as by how other countries managed the situation. Until then, schools continued their activity online.

The first case with the more contagious British COVID-19 strain (Lineage B.1.1.7) was confirmed in Romania on 8 January, on a woman from Giurgiu County. She, however, did not travel outside Romania. It was followed by 16 other cases in an outbreak at the School No. 28 of Bucharest.

On 15 January, Romania entered the second phase of the process of vaccinating against COVID-19, when President Iohannis was vaccinated against the virus.

On 18 January, the National Committee for Emergency Situations had decided to exempt the people who have gotten the second dose of the COVID-19 vaccine at least 10 days prior to their arrival in Romania from countries considered high-risk. If the vaccinated person arrives in the country with their children, they would still have to remain in quarantine with them, because the vaccines that were authorized at the time cannot be administered on children.

The final decision on schools was made on 2 February. In a press release issued by President Klaus Iohannis on that day, he announced that schools would reopen on 8 February, based on local incidence rates, after a review of the epidemiological situation in Romania and of what other member states of the European Union do. Students would be tested for COVID-19 in school if it presents symptoms of the virus during courses, with the agreement of their parents. Cîmpeanu stated that the usage of transport services for school should not be a factor of transmission.

=== 8 February – 8 March 2021: Second reopening of schools, spread of new variants ===
On 8 February, schools were reopened for the second time during the pandemic. Unlike in fall 2020, schoolwide restrictions based on the three scenarios were different. Thus, in the yellow scenario, unless the student attended primary education or were in a final year, every student attended courses exclusively online. Only primary school students would attend school physically in the red scenario.

On 10 February, prime minister Florin Cîțu announced that the incidence rate of COVID-19 cases would begin to include outbreaks in over 14 days from the announcement date, with the state of alert being prolonged with 30 more days. The following day, the first case among students who participate physically since 8 February was detected, on a girl in 2nd grade from Bucharest. Four other cases were detected at noon, which included one teacher, before the number of detected cases of infected students and school personnel began to surge throughout the day. In total, there were 244 students and 329 school personnel that were infected with COVID-19 since 8 February, all of which cases were, according to the Ministry of Education, based on infection in the week before the reopening of schools. In a press release on the same day, president Iohannis said that the situation was good after the reopening of schools.

The total number of infections in schools exceeded 1,000 by 17 February, when 600 students and 472 school personnel were reported to have tested positive since the reopening.

On 18 February, MedLife announced that the Lineage B.1.1.7 strain had become the dominant variant in Romania's major cities and that it would most likely become the most frequent variant in the country in around 3–5 weeks. They've analysed 90 samples, and 50% of them contained the strain that originated from the United Kingdom.

On 24 February, the National Institute of Public Health had done an analysis on the evolution of the pandemic in Romania. They estimated a new resurgence in new infections, with the worst scenario being a rise by 4% in new cases, to a medium amount of almost 9,000 new infections per day by 20 March. The incidence rate of cases began including outbreaks from 26 February 2021, as announced earlier.

On 27 February, the Minister of Education Sorin Cîmpeanu proposed that students in the VIII and XII grades mandatorily go physically to school in localities in the red scenario, as they attend national exams during summer. The next day, the National Council of Students said it disapproves this idea due to the high-risk of infection in these localities and asked the Ministry to adopt a measure in which students/parents have the freedom to choose between physical and digital learning.

The third wave had become noticeable in statistics by 2 March. Experts say that the third wave would this time affect younger people more than adults. More counties and localities have entered the red scenario, in which several restrictive measures were taken, including closure of schools for students in the 8th and 12th grades, restaurants, cafes, gambling halls, cinemas and cultural institutions.

On 5 March, the first two cases of the South African variant, the Lineage B.1.351, were confirmed in Romania, in patients from Bucharest and Pitești respectively. The same day, the National Committee for Emergency Situations adopted Decision number 15 which modifies the common agreement between the Ministries of Health and Education on the functioning of schools during the pandemic, so that students in 8th and 12th grades were allowed to participate physically in school no matter what, unless the locality the school was located in was quarantined. A common agreement between the Ministries of Health and Education issued on the next day mentioned that only up to half of students of every class of 8th and 12th grades would physically attend school. In addition, face masks were no longer mandatory for during physical education (if in outdoor) and for preschoolers regardless of age.

On 8 March, the first two cases of the Brazilian variant were confirmed in Romania, both in Bucharest.

=== 9–25 March 2021: Third wave of cases ===
On 9 March, as the number of new cases in 24 hours was nearing 5,000, President Klaus Iohannis issued a press release, where he announced that the night curfew would begin an hour earlier, at 22:00 (10:00 pm). He also stated that there would never be a nationwide lockdown interfering with the Easter holidays of 2021 as a measure to curb the third wave of cases.

On 15 March, Romania entered the third phase of the process of vaccination against COVID-19. This was the final phase, in which the general population who meet the minimum eligibility age (16) would be vaccinated.

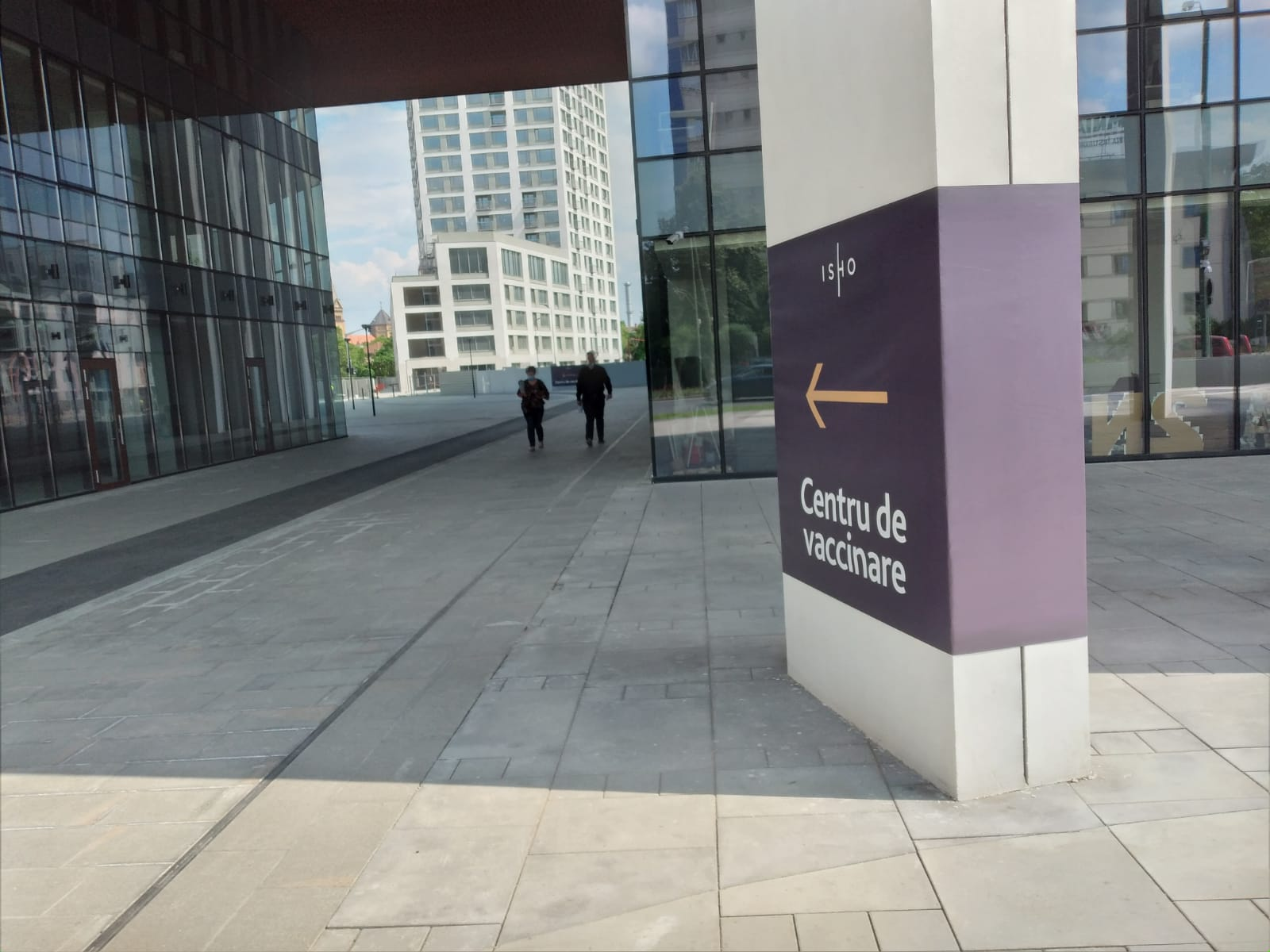
Vaccination centre in Timișoara (2021)

On 23 March, the Minister of Education Sorin Cîmpeanu announced the modification of the 2020–2021 school year structure so that students would be on holiday between 2 April and 4 May, to reduce mobility amid the third wave of infections.

On 25 March, the government announced a series of new restrictions. This included closure of gyms in localities where the incidence rate exceeded 4/1,000 inhabitants, while on Friday and at the weekend, the night curfew would begin at 20:00, with activity of economic operators allowed until 18:00. In localities where the incidence rate was over 7,5/1,000 inhabitants, imposed restrictions on Friday and the weekend would apply every day. The same day, Cîmpeanu announced that the school holiday would be interrupted between 12 and 29 April for students in their final years; all schools remained closed but distance education would be used. In addition, the school holiday was set to end on 9 May for these students.

=== 10 August–20 October 2021: Fourth wave of cases ===
The fourth wave was the most severe of all infection waves in the COVID-19 pandemic. Romania was the European Union member state with the second lowest percentage of fully vaccinated people, after Bulgaria. Romania hit record highs in the infections and deaths toll, occupying the 3rd place in new deaths and the 4th place in new infections worldwide on 13 October, and 2nd highest per capita COVID-19 death rate in the world as of 19 October 2021. Roughly 13% of the 42,000 overall epidemic-related deaths have occurred in October, with the low vaccination rate exposing entrenched distrust in state institutions, misinformation campaigns, poor rural infrastructure and weak vaccine education.

The pressure on the Romanian healthcare system that reached its maximum capacity in the fourth wave led to the authorities asking the European Union for help through its Civil Protection Mechanism. Furthermore, the World Health Organization (WHO) was also concerned, with the fourth wave in Romania prompting them to have a teleconference with the National Institute of Public Health (INSP) on the matter on 18 October 2021.

Despite the severity of this wave compared to others, the Romanian government had chosen to take a slightly more relaxed approach, unwilling to close the economy even partially in any way, shape or form. To avoid closures and radical restrictive measures, it had chosen to instead impose a digital green certificate requirement for some activities. Schools remained open despite the epidemiological situation, with Education Minister Sorin Cîmpeanu advocating strictly for the "close last, open first" strategy of school functioning. Schools would only close if at least half of its personnel and students were found infected, or at the directors' request. The Public Health Directorate (DSP) of Ilfov, one of the most affected counties by the fourth wave with an incidence rate of over 15/1,000 on 13 October 2021, set school closures countywide for at least 14 days starting 18 October, a decision severely criticised by Cîmpeanu, who was accused shortly afterwards by parents of ignoring health authorities. In localities with incidence rate over 6/1,000, face masks have been required in outdoor areas, while a night curfew was imposed. Vaccinated people wouldn't be affected this time by the curfew, which would apply between 20:00 and 5:00, and the unvaccinated was required to stay home and not go out for unessential tasks.

=== 28 December 2021–present: Fifth wave of cases and aftermath ===
On 8 January 2022, Romania reintroduces mandatory face mask wearing in outdoor and indoor public spaces, reduces the operating hours and capacity of bars, restaurants, cinemas, gyms, and sporting events, and also reduces the quarantine period, amid concern that the next wave of COVID-19 could overwhelm the health system. On 21 January, Romania reported a record 19,649 new cases of COVID-19 and the next day exceeded 2 million COVID-19 cases since the beginning of the pandemic.

The state of alert initially decreed on 15 May 2020 and then continually renewed was finally lifted on 8 March 2022, upon the fall of the fifth wave of COVID-19 cases. This also meant a series of relaxation measures. President Klaus Iohannis stated that this can be considered the start of "a new stage [of the pandemic]".

== Vaccinations ==
Romania received the first 10,000 vaccines against the virus on 26 December 2020 and officially started the vaccination campaign on Sunday, 27 December. The first person who took the vaccine was a nurse from the Matei Bals Institute for Infectious Diseases in Bucharest. She was soon followed by several hundred doctors and nurses from COVID-19 dedicated hospitals throughout the country. Romania contracted about 10 million vaccines made by BioNTech-Pfizer. Vaccination was free of charge and non-mandatory. By 27 January 2022, over 50% of the country's eligible population received at least one dose of the vaccine.

== Local lockdowns ==
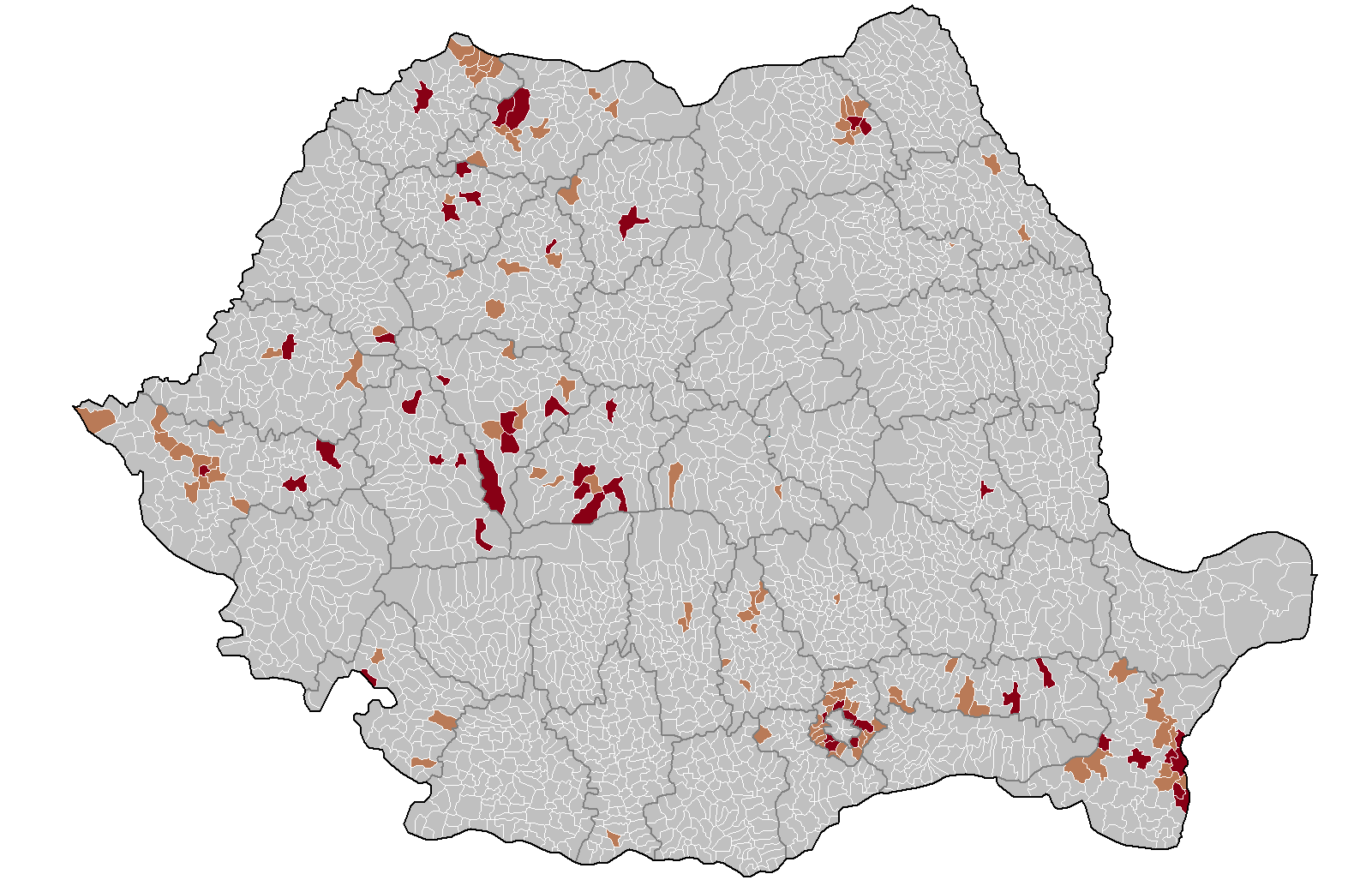
Cities (dark brown) and communes (light brown) placed on local lockdown during the pandemic

City/Commune	First imposition of lockdown^{1}	Ref.
Alba County
Abrud	17 November 2020	
Alba Iulia	17 November 2020	
Blaj	17 November 2020	
Ciugud	17 November 2020	
Cugir	17 November 2020	
Sebeș	17 November 2020	
Vințu de Jos	29 November 2020	
Șona	10 March 2021	
Rimetea	26 March 2021	
Arad County
Gurahonț	1 August 2020	
Seleuș	1 August 2020	
Ineu	25 November 2020	
Argeș County
Bălilești	1 August 2020	
Dârmănești	1 August 2020	
Bihor County
Câmpani	18 November 2020	
Nucet	2 December 2020	
Bistrița-Năsăud County
Bistrița	19 November 2020	
Ciceu-Giurgești	27 February 2021	
Brașov County
Sâmbăta de Sus	17 November 2020	
Sânpetru	18 March 2021	
Cluj County
Sic	23 October 2020	
Săvădisla	23 October 2020	
Gherla	5 November 2020	
Chinteni	14 November 2020	
Izvoru Crișului	14 November 2020	
Constanța County
Ovidiu	7 November 2020	
Constanța	20 November 2020	
Agigea	21 November 2020	
Costinești	21 November 2020	
Lumina	21 November 2020	
Medgidia	21 November 2020	
Mihail Kogălniceanu	21 November 2020	
Techirghiol	21 November 2020	
Valu lui Traian	21 November 2020	
Năvodari	22 November 2020	
Eforie	26 November 2020	
Cernavodă	28 November 2020	
Cumpăna	28 November 2020	
Târgușor	28 November 2020	
Aliman	2 December 2020	
Rasova	2 December 2020	
Tuzla	2 December 2020	
Saraiu	27 March 2021	
Dâmbovița County
Valea Mare	16 November 2020	
Bezdead	11 March 2020	
Aninoasa	22 March 2021	
Brănești	22 March 2021	
Buciumeni	26 March 2021	
Mogoșani	28 March 2021	
Giurgiu County
Roata de Jos	22 July 2020	
Hunedoara County
Brad	23 March 2021	
Petroșani	23 March 2021	
Simeria	23 March 2021	
Orăștie	28 March 2021	
Ialomița County
Țăndărei	4 April 2020	
Slobozia	13 November 2020	
Drăgoești	8 March 2021	
Roșiori	13 March 2021	
Ciochina	16 March 2021	
Grindu	21 March 2021	
Buești	24 March 2021	
Iași County
Ciurea	29 November 2020	
Roșcani	17 March 2021	
Ilfov County
Ciorogârla	13 November 2020	
Berceni	19 November 2020	
Clinceni	19 November 2020	
Bragadiru	20 November 2020	
Chiajna	20 November 2020	
Corbeanca	21 November 2020	
Dobroești	21 November 2020	
Măgurele	21 November 2020	
Mogoșoaia	21 November 2020	
Otopeni	21 November 2020	
Popești-Leordeni	21 November 2020	
Cornetu	16 March 2021	
Brănești	18 March 2021	
Tunari	19 March 2021	
Domnești	20 March 2021	
Jilava	20 March 2021	
Pantelimon	20 March 2021	
Voluntari	20 March 2021	
Chitila	22 March 2021	
Balotești	24 March 2021	
Snagov	24 March 2021	
Ștefăneștii de Jos	24 March 2021	
Glina	26 March 2021	
Dragomirești-Vale	30 March 2021	
Cernica	1 April 2021	
1 Decembrie	2 April 2021	
Copăceni	6 April 2021	
Maramureș County
Petrova	23 October 2020	
Vișeu de Jos	25 October 2020	
Recea	28 October 2020	
Groși	2 November 2020	
Săcălășeni	10 November 2020	
Tăuții-Măgherăuș	10 November 2020	
Baia Mare	11 November 2020	
Șișești	26 February 2021	
Ulmeni	8 March 2021	
Coltău	10 March 2021	
Mehedinți County
Braniștea	17 November 2020	
Vânători	20 March 2021	
Godeanu	28 March 2021	
Bâcleș	1 April 2021	
Drobeta-Turnu Severin	11 October 2021	
Neamț County
Bâra	13 March 2021	
Olt County
Vișina Nouă	3 March 2021	
Prahova County
Gornet	22 July 2020	
Satu Mare County
Satu Mare	19 November 2020	
Bătarci	12 September 2021	
Bixad	12 September 2021	
Călinești-Oaș	12 September 2021	
Cămărzana	12 September 2021	
Gherța Mică	12 September 2021	
Târșolț	12 September 2021	
Turț	12 September 2021	
Sălaj County
Cehu Silvaniei	5 November 2020	
Jibou	5 November 2020	
Zalău	5 November 2020	
Crișeni	16 November 2020	
Sibiu County
Cisnădie	16 November 2020	
Sibiu	16 November 2020	
Șelimbăr	16 November 2020	
Tălmaciu	16 November 2020	
Avrig	23 November 2020	
Mediaș	23 November 2020	
Orlat	23 November 2020	
Tilișca	20 March 2021	
Suceava County
Adâncata	30 March 2020	
Ipotești	30 March 2020	
Mitocu Dragomirnei	30 March 2020	
Moara	30 March 2020	
Pătrăuți	30 March 2020	
Salcea	30 March 2020	
Suceava	30 March 2020	
Șcheia	30 March 2020	
Timiș County
Făget	26 July 2020	
Becicherecu Mic	5 November 2020	
Dudeștii Noi	5 November 2020	
Dumbrăvița	5 November 2020	
Fibiș	5 November 2020	
Ghiroda	5 November 2020	
Giroc	5 November 2020	
Moșnița Nouă	5 November 2020	
Pesac	5 November 2020	
Lugoj	21 November 2020	
Nițchidorf	17 February 2021	
Șag	17 February 2021	
Șandra	17 February 2021	
Dudeștii Vechi	2 March 2021	
Biled	3 March 2021	
Otelec	3 March 2021	
Timișoara	8 March 2021	
Vrancea County
Focșani	22 October 2021	
^{1}Some localities entered lockdown several times during 2020 and 2021.

== Impact ==
=== Economics ===
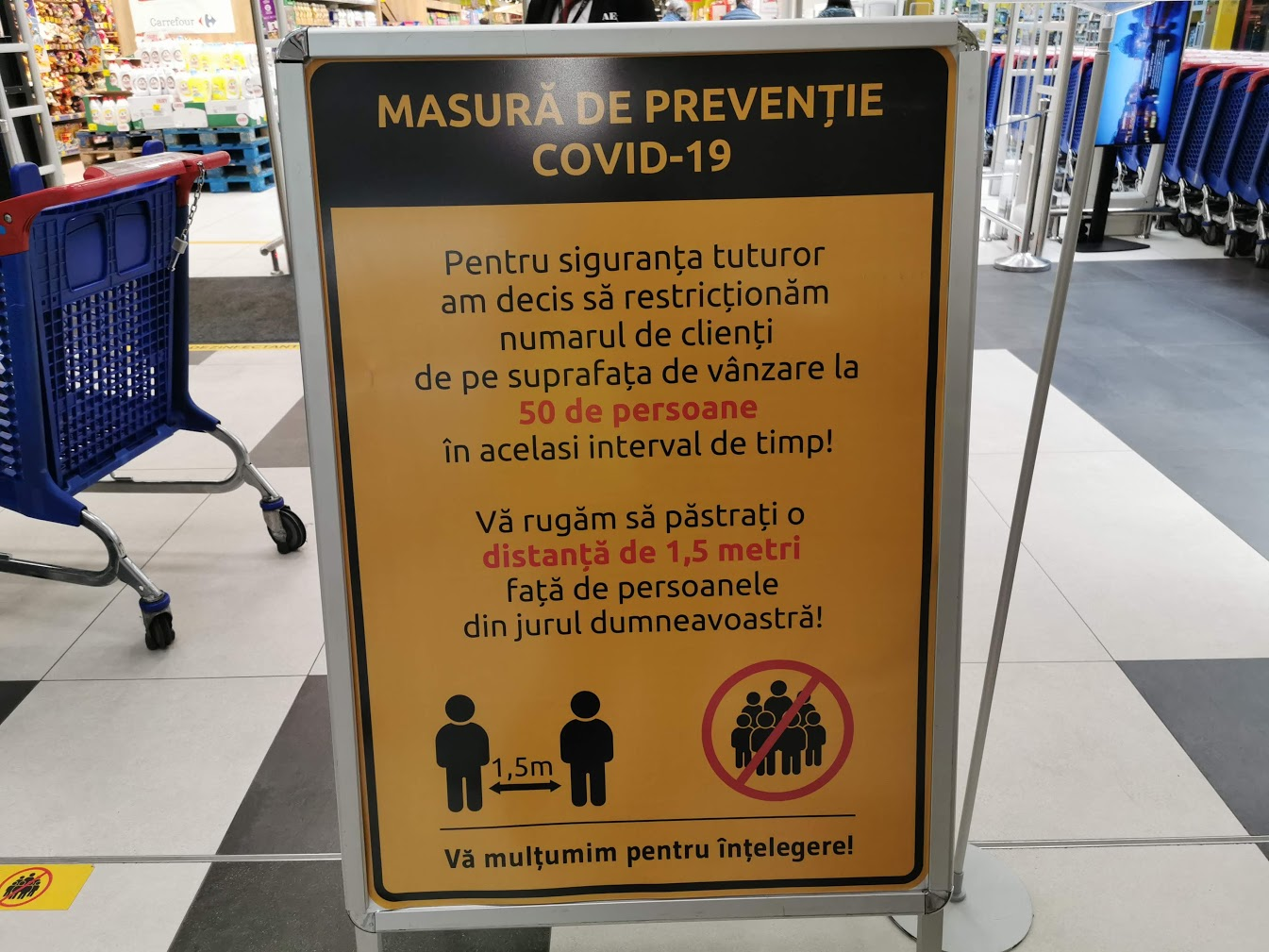
"Please keep your distance" notice in a Bucharest supermarket, 28 March 2020

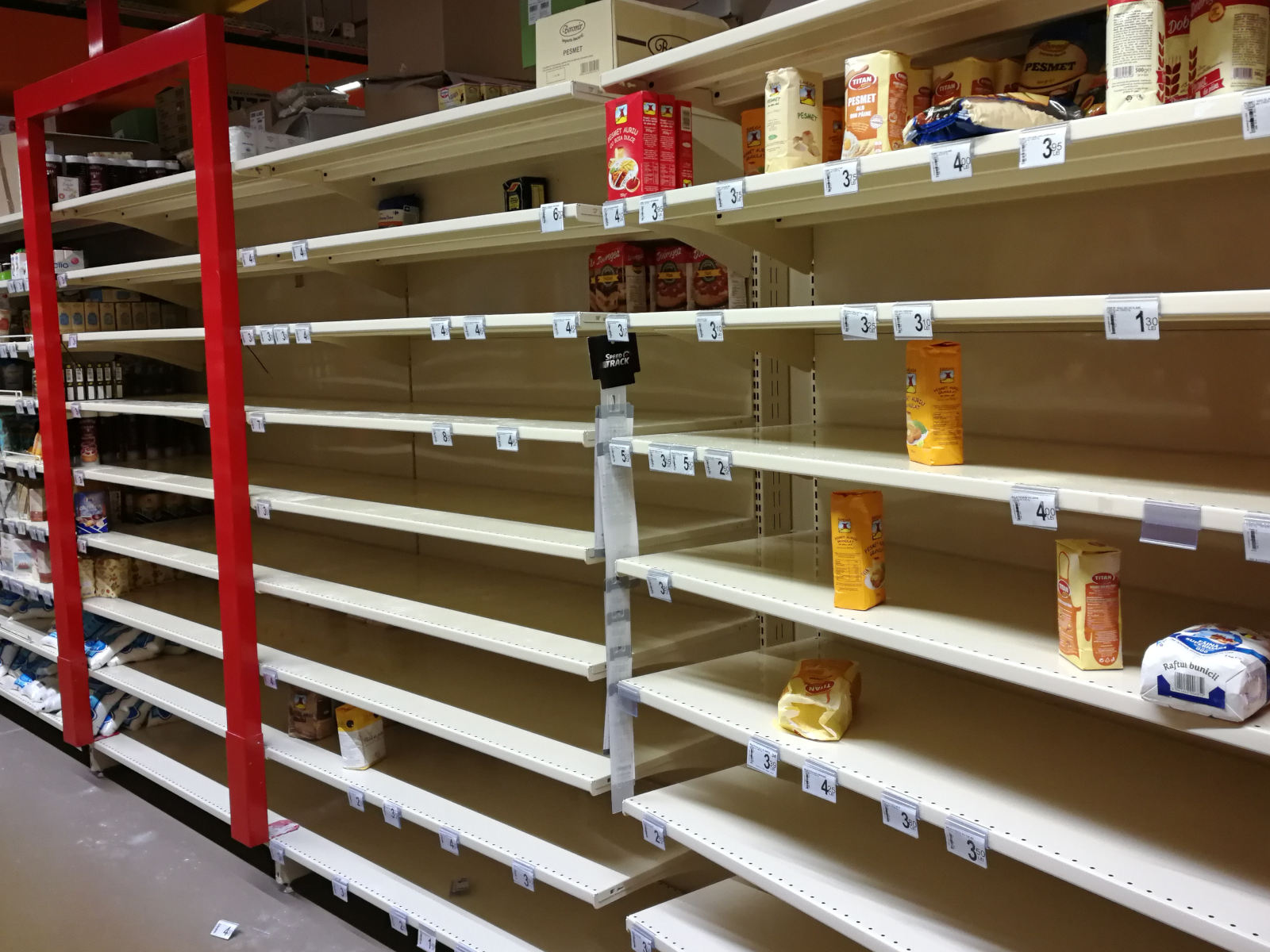
Flour almost sold out, Brașov, 14 March

During the second week of March, the Bucharest Stock Exchange recorded value loss during all five trading sessions, the main index BET collapsing by 17.6%, the steepest decline since December 2018.

On 16 March, the National Bank of Romania announced a reference rate of 4.8242 lei/euro, a historical maximum for the single European currency against the leu. The leu continued its depreciation, reaching a maximum of 4.9156 lei/euro on 30 March 2021.

Romania's economy contracted by 4.7% in H1 of 2020, driven by a decline of 10.5% in Q2. On the demand side, exports of goods and services fell by 15.1% in H1 of 2020, as European trading partners were significantly affected by the crisis. Imports contracted less than exports (down 9.4%), leading to a 21% increase in the trade deficit in H1. The weakening of external demand from Europe alongside pandemic-related restrictions caused industry to contract by 14.1% in H1. The sharp decline in output led to deteriorating labor market conditions, with deeper effects noted for younger workers and women: job vacancies fell between Q1 and Q2 2020, while the unemployment rate increased to 5.4% in July from 4.1% in February. Job and household income losses were stemmed by the technical unemployment relief program, which covered 1.3 million beneficiaries during the state of emergency at a cost of approximately 370 million euros (0.2% of GDP).

According to the autumn economic forecasts published on 5 November by the European Commission, Romania's economy would record a contraction of 5.2% in 2020, less severe than initially estimated, thanks to investments and construction works. Also, Romania's budget deficit was expected to increase significantly, up to 10.3% of GDP, in the context in which the fiscal effort needed to combat the crisis was added to the past fiscal slippages. Consequently, Romania's debt-to-GDP ratio was forecast to increase from 35.3% in 2019 to 46.7% in 2020.

=== Education ===
On 9 March 2020, interim Prime Minister Ludovic Orban announced the closure of all schools between 11 and 22 March. The measure targeted all kindergartens, primary, secondary and high schools in Romania, both public and private, according to Education Minister Monica Anisie. The decision affected 3.5 million students. Likewise, several universities in the major student centres suspended their courses. These include the University of Bucharest, the Bucharest Academy of Economic Studies, the Politehnica University of Bucharest, the Babeș-Bolyai University and the West University of Timișoara, among others. Furthermore, Anisie announced that, as a measure of prevention and control of the illnesses with COVID-19 in schools, the Ministry of Education had decided to suspend all county and regional school olympiads, as well as sports competitions. Schools were closed suddenly, without any prior preparation. The Ministry of Education was constantly encouraging teachers to continue the educational process online, but they were not offered any support, on a national level. The Government made available a single resource on the national public television channel TVR, a show called Teleșcoală (Teleschool), in which children could observe mathematics, Romanian, biology, history and geography classes. The program was divided into two sections, between 9 and 10 a.m. courses for the 8th grade and between 3 and 4 p.m. courses for the 12th grade; the courses could be watched both on TV and on TVR's YouTube channel. In the first week of broadcasting, the program was watched by 1.3 million people, being the most watched TVR content between 16 and 21 March.

On 16 March, Anisie announced that schools would remain closed while the state of emergency was in place, at least until after the Easter holidays. On 1 April, in response to a fake news story which had gained traction on social media and was being distributed on WhatsApp, saying that students would have to return to school in less than a week, Anisie and the Ministry of Education issued an official statement condemning the spread of false information and promised to provide in the next few days the date for the reopening of schools, as well as the national examinations. On 6 April, Anisie announced the cancellation of national exam simulations, as well as of all school competitions and olympiads. The Minister of Education said that the Baccalaureate and the National Evaluation would most likely be held in July, all of the examinations excluding the second semester curriculum.

In May, four months before the start of the new school year, the Government announced the purchase of 250,000 tablets to facilitate distance learning activities. For these tablets, the Government allocated 150 million lei from the reserve fund, both for devices and internet services. Previously, Anisie stated that approximately 250,000 students do not have access to technology and thus cannot attend online courses. Of the 250,000 tablets, around 82,000 were purchased through the National Office for Centralized Acquisitions. As of November, just over 43,000 were distributed to students.

A study conducted by World Vision Romania between 10 May and 27 June showed that approximately 40% of students in rural areas did not participate in online courses and only 64% of teachers organized such courses. Moreover, according to the same study, 1 in 4 rural schools does not have an internet connection, and 9 out of 10 do not have laptops, PCs or tablets for digital education.

In a government meeting on 5 November, President Klaus Iohannis announced a series of partial quarantine measures, including the closure of all schools nationwide and the transition to online education for the next 30 days. During this period, only nurseries and after-schools remained open. The president's announcement, later doubled by a government decision, sparked a wave of discontent. The National Council of Students announced in a statement that it disapproves of the measure, as many schools were located in communities where the transmission rate was less than 3 per thousand inhabitants and hundreds of thousands of students in Romania do not have the opportunity to access online courses due to lack of digital infrastructure. According to a survey by the National Federation of Parents' Associations, about 47.2% of parents considered that the closure of schools was not a good one for the education system, while 45.2% of them considered this decision as a necessary one.

On 7 November, Anisie announced that students would no longer take their theses in the 2020–2021 school year, which was replaced by a summative evaluation.

Schools were reopened nationwide on 8 February. Despite their autonomy in relation to education-related decisions, most universities did not resume regular, face-to-face, courses, mainly due to restrictions imposed to in-door group gatherings. However, as new cases have risen in the country, the structure of the 2020–2021 school year was modified so the spring break began on 2 April and ended on 4 May, however doesn't apply to students in terminal years, who would instead have to attend online courses between 12 and 29 April, with spring break ending on 9 May.

Schools reopened, once again, on 5 and 10 May respectively (depending on grade), but with two scenarios rather than three. Schools in localities with an incidence rate below 1/1,000 inhabitants would be completely open, while in localities with an incidence rate above 1/1,000 inhabitants only pupils in primary and special education, as well as students in either the 8th, 12th or 13th grades, in terminal years of postliceal and vocational education, and those who attend recovery courses would go physically to school, unless the locality was quarantined.

=== Sports ===
The Romanian Football Federation and the Romanian Handball Federation decided to suspend all matches until 31 March. The rugby match between Romania and Belgium, to be held in Botoșani on 14 March, was postponed by Rugby Europe. The IWF Junior World Weightlifting Championships in Bucharest, scheduled for 14–21 March, were cancelled.

=== Tourism ===
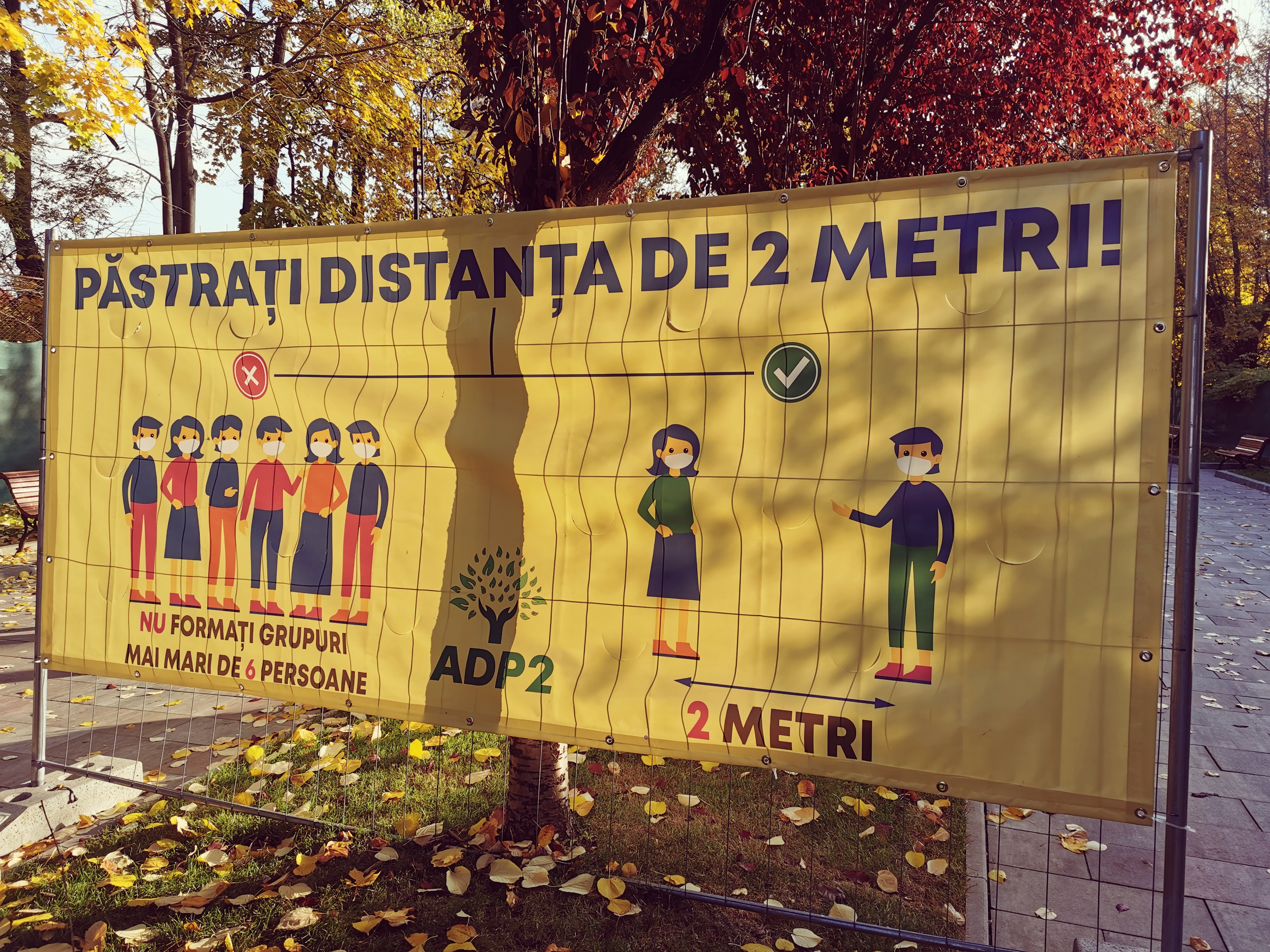
"Please maintain a distance of 2 meters!" notice in a Bucharest park, 15 November 2020

The Romanian tourism industry was severely affected by the COVID-19 pandemic and the measures taken in an attempt to stop the spread of the virus. Both hotels and travel agencies have seen massive decreases in bookings and cancellations of events. Since the beginning of March, the occupancy rate of hotels decreased by 40% in Bucharest and by 50% in resorts. In the first nine months of the year, arrivals in tourist reception facilities decreased by 50.6%, overnight stays by 49.5%, and arrivals of foreign visitors decreased by 59%.

Evolution of key tourism indicators during 2020
	Jan	Feb	Mar	Apr	May	Jun	Jul	Aug	Sep	Oct	Nov	Dec
Arrivals	▲5%	▼4.5%	▼69.8%	▼98.1%	▼96.9%	▼74.5%	▼44.4%	▼30.4%	▼39.5%	▼54.4%	▼62.5%	▼59%
Overnight stays	▲7%	▼6.1%	▼68.2%	▼97.4%	▼97%	▼76.4%	▼44.7%	▼31.8%	▼36.9%	▼54.8%	▼64.7%	▼63%
Foreign visitors	▲12.7%	▲9.6%	▼50.1%	▼83.3%	▼81.5%	▼68.7%	▼69%	▼71.2%	▼66.2%	▼65.4%	▼67.6%	▼69%
Source: National Institute of Statistics

Teleworking became a necessary practice for many firms and workers during the lockdown period of the COVID-19 crisis. Due to the nature of the activity, only 7% of jobs in hospitality industry can plausibly be performed at home. As of 28 April, the Ministry of Labor reported 114,494 individual employment contracts suspended in the hotels and restaurants sector.

=== Human rights ===
The government's response to COVID-19 raised human rights concerns including in relation to policing, the right to freedom of peaceful assembly and the right to education.

On 16 March 2020, President Iohannis signed an emergency decree, giving authorities the power to remove, report or close websites spreading fake news about the COVID-19 pandemic, with no opportunity to appeal. On 30 March, the OSCE Representative on Freedom of the Media, Harlem Désir, expressed his concerns about the provisions of the emergency decree, noting that they "pose a risk of undue restriction to the work of journalists, of self-censorship for media actors trying to inform the public, and could even be counterproductive". Previously, several civil society organizations issued a manifesto to request for greater transparency of data related to the spread of COVID-19 in Romania.

On 19 March, Romania activated Article 15 of the European Convention on Human Rights, which allows signatories to derogate from the convention in times of a "public emergency threatening the life of the nation".

== Cases ==
Until 26 September 2021, the National Institute of Public Health reported 1,199,761 cases of COVID-19. Bucharest accumulates 17.2% of the total number of infections. It was followed by Cluj with 5.3%, Timiș with 5.1%, Ilfov with 4.2% and Constanța with 4%. 1 in 77 reported cases was recorded among medical staff. A study conducted by the Sanitary Solidarity Federation in October 2020 revealed that about 10% of respondents had already been infected with SARS-CoV-2. According to the same study, nurses have the largest share of all infected workers and have the highest percentage of infection among occupational categories.

As of 26 September 2021, there were 36,450 COVID-19-related deaths, with 9.1% of them reported in Bucharest, 4.5% in Prahova, 3.9% in Bihor, 3.8% in Timiș and 3.8% in Suceava. 85.8% of all deaths were in people over 60, and 57.7% of deaths were in men. 94.5% of the deceased had at least one associated comorbidity. A November 2020 study by the National Institute of Public Health on data from the records of 21,766 patients indicated that the main risk factors for death in patients with COVID-19 in Romania were cardiovascular diseases, chronic kidney diseases and cancer.

Green scenario (<1.5 cases/1,000 inhab.)
Orange scenario (1.5–3 cases/1,000 inhab.)
Red scenario (>3 cases/1,000 inhab.)

Data valid as of 4 February 2022, 1:00 p.m. (EET)
County	Cases	Recoveries	Deaths	Incidence^{1}
Bucharest	399,151	329,000	5,163	26.42
Ilfov	93,461	77,109	738	21.57
Bucharest–Ilfov	492,612	406,109	5,901	—N/a
Alba	43,699	36,178	1,158	16.71
Brașov	87,015	76,120	1,907	20.33
Covasna	15,860	13,720	603	7.95
Harghita	19,396	16,092	911	9.34
Mureș	50,283	46,063	1,740	11.83
Sibiu	58,236	43,682	1,701	20.51
Centru	274,489	231,855	8,020	—N/a
Bacău	54,452	44,712	1,865	10.47
Botoșani	31,619	22,650	1,234	11.95
Iași	92,388	71,100	2,160	12.31
Neamț	41,345	31,130	1,470	10.57
Suceava	53,614	44,409	2,146	9.38
Vaslui	31,841	25,020	1,278	5.76
Northeast	305,259	239,021	10,153	—N/a
Bihor	70,429	57,895	2,686	18.94
Bistrița-Năsăud	25,352	22,020	1,055	10.78
Cluj	121,263	89,700	1,139	26.97
Maramureș	44,772	34,210	1,653	15.27
Satu Mare	28,548	24,020	769	11.01
Sălaj	23,438	20,024	720	14.45
Northwest	313,802	247,869	8,022	—N/a
Argeș	56,688	44,700	1,844	12.36
Călărași	21,231	16,520	877	7.91
Dâmbovița	44,445	35,250	1,393	9.11
Giurgiu	22,692	17,548	455	7.2
Ialomița	22,552	18,020	918	6.45
Prahova	78,244	67,907	2,761	11.45
Teleorman	28,311	24,270	775	5.45
South	274,163	224,215	9,023	—N/a
Brăila	26,203	22,020	1,212	6.03
Buzău	31,831	25,805	894	10.36
Constanța	91,972	76,200	2,305	20.28
Galați	53,181	44,540	1,708	9.11
Tulcea	17,994	15,236	501	12.23
Vrancea	22,349	18,848	895	7.26
Southeast	243,530	202,649	7,515	—N/a
Dolj	56,447	45,150	1,387	11.03
Gorj	18,447	17,140	881	6.06
Mehedinți	18,092	15,180	877	5.09
Olt	30,311	26,420	757	6.52
Vâlcea	32,493	27,010	881	11.31
Southwest	155,790	130,900	4,783	—N/a
Arad	55,614	46,089	1,711	16.92
Caraș-Severin	23,950	19,500	1,182	9.62
Hunedoara	46,776	35,420	1,268	14.71
Timiș	122,245	88,400	1,910	27.43
West	248,585	189,409	6,071	—N/a
Unknown	48,562	100,375	962	—N/a
Romania	2,356,792	1,972,402	60,450	16.65
^{1} 14-day case notification rate per 1,000 inhabitants Sources: geo-spatial.org, datelazi.ro

Number of COVID-19 confirmed cases among Romanians abroad
Cases	Deaths
Spain: 16,951; Germany: 3,127; Italy: 2,558; Ireland: 218; United Kingdom: 209; Austria: 151; France: 138; Greece: 99; Switzerland: 75; Cyprus: 52; Denmark: 49; Hungary: 37; Netherlands: 28; Belgium: 22; Moldova: 18; Croatia: 14; South Korea: 14; UAE: 14; United States: 12; Sweden: 11; Bulgaria: 8; India: 8; Turkey: 8; Ukraine: 8; Japan: 6; Poland: 6; Portugal: 6; Singapore: 5; Tunisia: 5; Serbia: 4; Montenegro: 3; Belarus: 2; Bosnia and Herzegovina: 2; Costa Rica: 2; Georgia: 2; Iceland: 2; Indonesia: 2; Namibia: 2; Turkmenistan: 2; Argentina: 1; Brazil: 1; Egypt: 1; Finland: 1; Iran: 1; Kazakhstan: 1; Kuwait: 1; Luxembourg: 1; Malta: 1; Mexico: 1; Nigeria: 1; Pakistan: 1; Qatar: 1; Republic of the Congo: 1; Russia: 1; Slovenia: 1; Vatican City: 1	Spain: 60; United Kingdom: 43; Italy: 40; France: 19; Germany: 14; Ireland: 5; Austria: 3; Sweden: 3; Belgium: 2; Switzerland: 2; Brazil: 1; Bulgaria: 1; Croatia: 1; Greece: 1; Iran: 1; Nigeria: 1; Poland: 1; Republic of the Congo: 1; Turkey: 1; United States: 1
23,897	201
Source: Strategic Communication Group

== Statistics ==
=== Total confirmed cases by gender ===
View source data.

=== Total confirmed cases by age ===
As of 14 March 2021, the average age of cases was 48 years. The average age of deaths was significantly higher, at 71 years.

Age category	No. of cases	Percentage
Data being processed	137	0%
>80	40,845	5%
70–79	77,878	9%
60–69	127,357	14%
50–59	163,639	18%
40–49	179,887	20%
30–39	152,470	17%
20–29	88,886	10%
10–19	36,564	4%
0–9	19,089	2%
Source: datelazi.ro

=== Cumulative cases ===
==== Nationwide ====
View source data.

=== New cases per day ===
View source data.

=== New deaths per day ===
View source data.

=== New recoveries per day ===
View source data.

=== RT-PCR tests processed per week ===
View source data.

=== Rapid antigen tests processed per day ===
View source data.

=== ICU patients ===
View source data.

== See also ==
- COVID-19 pandemic by country and territory
- COVID-19 pandemic in Europe
- COVID-19 pandemic in Moldova
  - Moldovan–Romanian collaboration during the COVID-19 pandemic
