= Salcea =

- Town
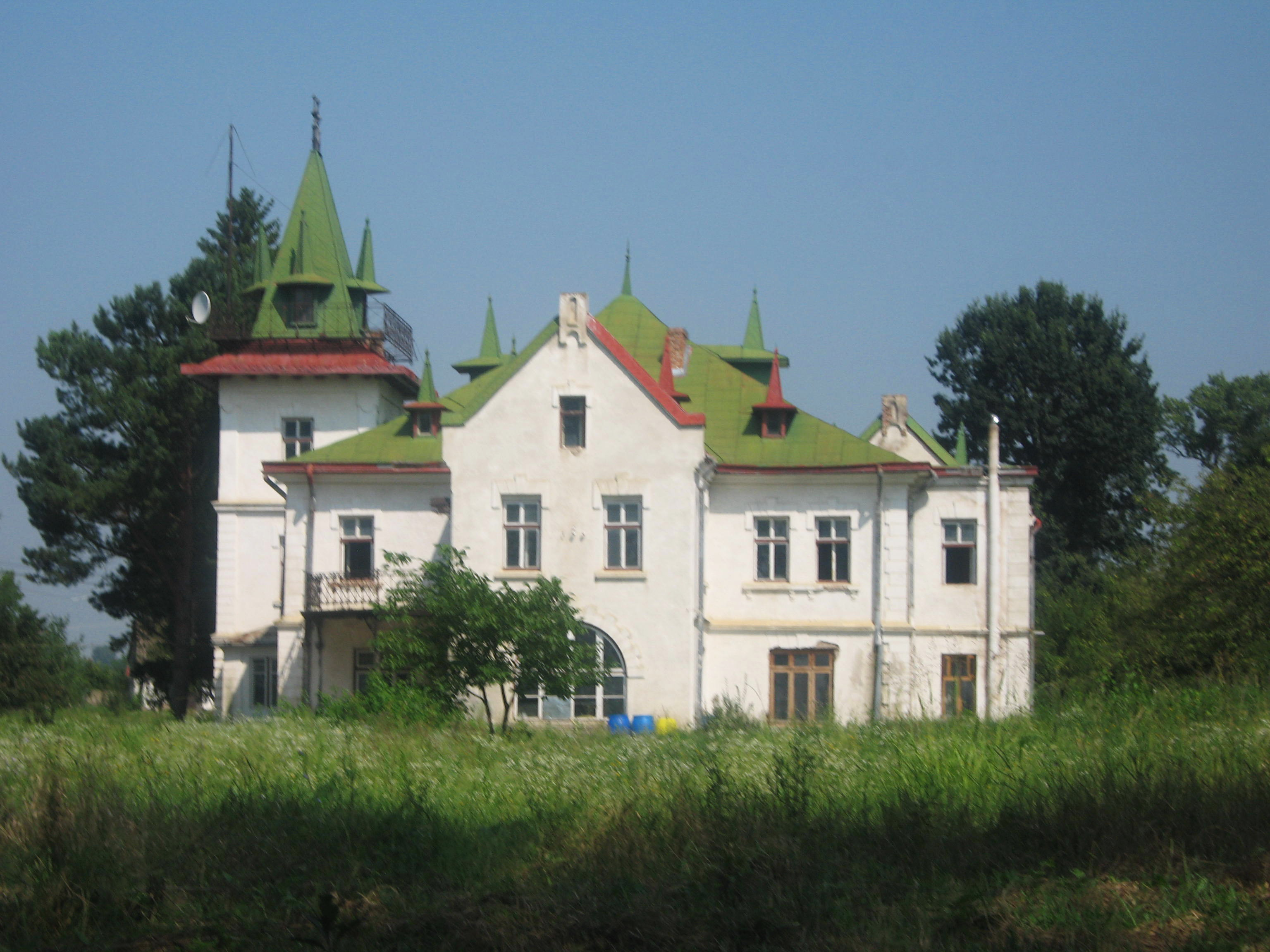
- Sturdza manor in Salcea

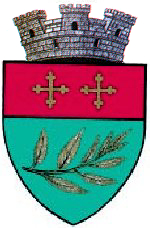
- Coat of arms

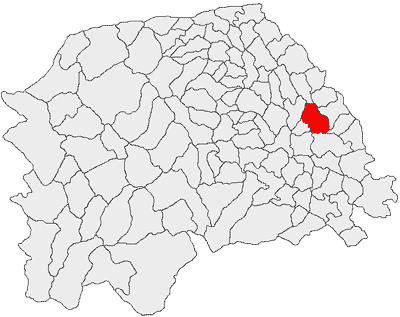
- Location in Suceava County

- Location in Romania
- Coordinates: 47°39′0″N 26°22′12″E
- Country: Romania
- County: Suceava

Government
  - Mayor (2024–2028): Pârwușor-Țicu-Ezekiel Belțic (PNL)
- Area: 40 km^{2} (15 sq mi)
- Population (2021-12-01): 9,513
  - Density: 240/km^{2} (620/sq mi)
- Time zone: UTC+02:00 (EET)
  - Summer (DST): UTC+03:00 (EEST)
- Vehicle reg.: SV
- Website: www.primariasalcea.ro

Salcea is a town in Suceava County, in the Western Moldavia historical region of northeastern Romania, with a population of 9,513. It administers four villages: Mereni, Plopeni, Prelipca, and Văratec. Salcea was declared a town in 2004.

The town is located at about 11 km (6.8 mi) east of Suceava and it is best known for the Suceava Airport located nearby.

== Demographics ==
According to the results of the 2021 census (postponed to 2022 because of the COVID-19 pandemic in Romania), the commune is currently inhabited by 9,513 people.

Historical population
Year	Pop.	±%
2002	8,719	—
2011	9,015	+3.4%
2022	9,513	+5.5%
Source: Official Romanian census data

== Administration and local politics ==
=== Town council ===
The town's former local council had the following political composition, according to the results of the 2020 local elections:

Party	Seats	Current Council
The Right Alternative (AD)	9	
National Liberal Party (PNL)	4	
People's Movement Party (PMP)	2	
Social Democratic Party (PSD)	2	

The town's current local council for the period 2024–2028 has the following multi-party political composition, based on the results of the votes cast at the 2024 Romanian local elections:

Party	Seats	Current Council
National Liberal Party (PNL)	13	
Alliance for the Union of Romanians (AUR)	2	
Social Democratic Party (PSD)	1	
People's Movement Party (PMP)	1	
