= Victor Costache =

Romanian politician and physician

Minister of Health
- In office 4 November 2019 – 26 March 2020
- Preceded by: Sorina Pintea
- Succeeded by: Nelu Tătaru

Personal details
- Born: 18 March 1974 (age 52) Iași, Socialist Republic of Romania
- Party: National Liberal Party
- Education: Alexandru Ioan Cuza University; Grigore T. Popa University of Medicine and Pharmacy
- Occupation: Associate Professor, Lucian Blaga University of Sibiu
- Profession: Physician, politician

Victor Sebastian Costache (born 18 March 1974) was the Minister of Health of Romania from 4 November 2019 to 26 March 2020 when he resigned in the midst of the COVID-19 pandemic in Romania. He was succeeded as Minister of Health by Nelu Tătaru.

Born in Iași, he studied from 1992 at the Alexandru Ioan Cuza University in the city, graduating in 1999 with an MD degree from the Grigore T. Popa University of Medicine and Pharmacy. He did his residency in Romania and France, with specialization in cardiovascular and thoracic surgery. After working for over 10 years in hospitals in France, Great Britain, Denmark, Scotland, Germany, Quebec, and the United States, Costache decided to return to Romania in 2014, becoming an associate professor at the Lucian Blaga University of Sibiu.

Since 2015 he is president of the Cardiovascular Surgery Commission at the Ministry of Health. He is also a member of the French Society of Thoracic and Cardiovascular Surgery.

== See also ==
- Second Orban cabinet
