= Țăndărei =

- Town
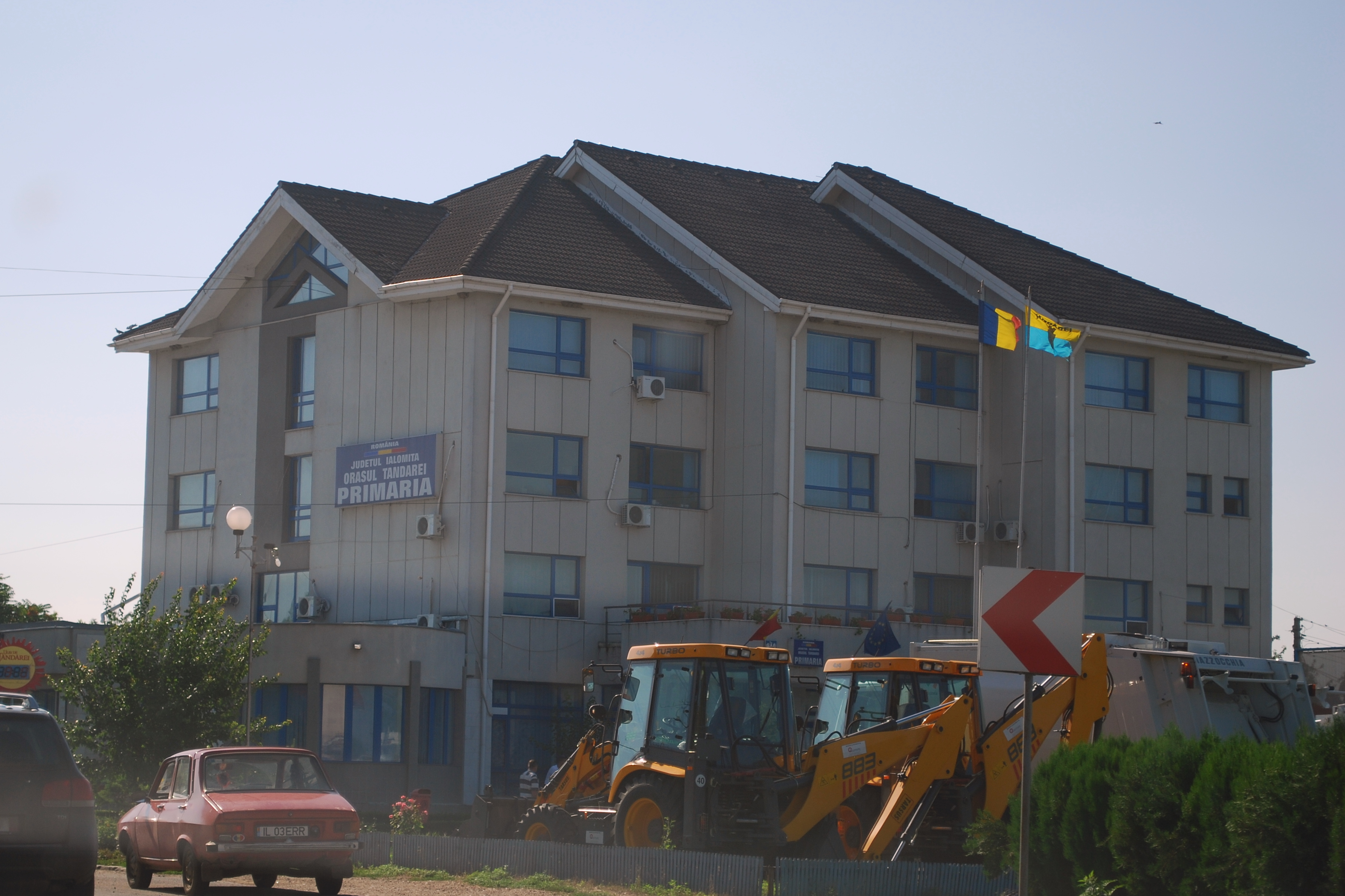
- Țăndărei town hall

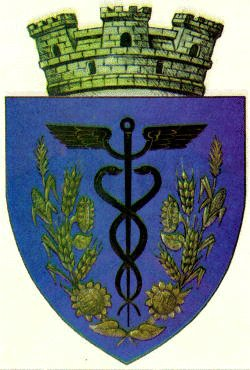
- Coat of arms

- Location in Ialomița County

- Location in Romania
- Coordinates: 44°38′33″N 27°39′22″E
- Country: Romania
- County: Ialomița

Government
  - Mayor (2024–2028): George Cristian Roman (PSD)
- Area: 113.25 km^{2} (43.73 sq mi)
- Elevation: 20 m (66 ft)
- Population (2021-12-01): 12,761
  - Density: 112.68/km^{2} (291.84/sq mi)
- Time zone: UTC+02:00 (EET)
  - Summer (DST): UTC+03:00 (EEST)
- Postal code: 925200
- Area code: (+40) 02 43
- Vehicle reg.: IL
- Website: primaria-tandarei.ro

Țăndărei (Romanian pronunciation: [t͡səndəˈrej]) is a town in Ialomița County, Muntenia, Romania. The town is located on the Bărăgan Plain, on the left bank of the Ialomița River. It was declared a town in 1968. It is crossed by the national road DN2A, which connects Slobozia with Constanța.

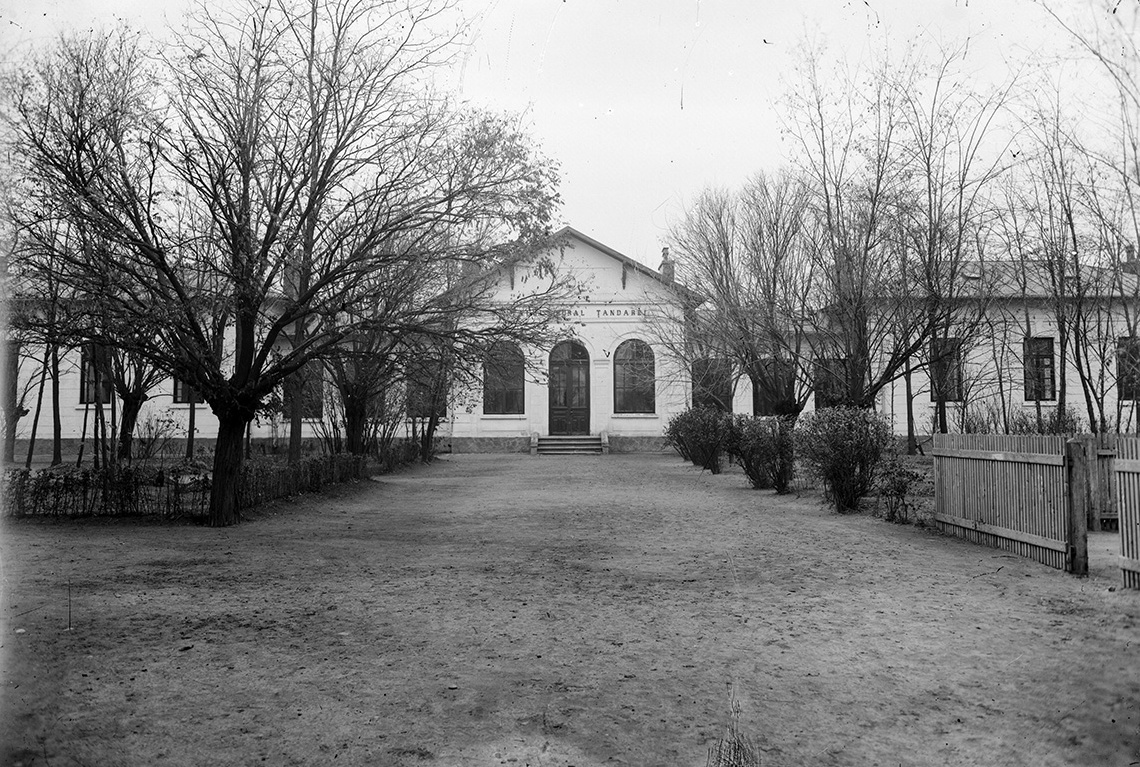
Țăndărei Rural Hospital, c.1930s

Țăndărei has been called a "Beverley Hills [sic] for Gypsy gangsters". The town gained this reputation as many ethnic Roma engaged in criminal activity as well as welfare fraud in the UK, using the money obtained from those activities to build opulent villas.

During the COVID-19 pandemic, the town was also in the spotlight of national media and of social media, because the ethnic Roma of the town were accused of bringing the virus from Western Europe and not respecting the anti-COVID measurements implemented by the government.

Historical population
Year	Pop.	±%
1899	2,900	—
1925	4,431	+52.8%
1977	10,166	+129.4%
1992	14,212	+39.8%
2002	12,462	−12.3%
2011	13,219	+6.1%
2021	12,761	−3.5%
Source: Census data

== Demographics ==
At the 2011 census, the town had 13,219 inhabitants; 65.47% of the population declared themselves as ethnic Romanian and 10.85% as Roma (23.55% did not declare any ethnicity and 0.11% declared another ethnicity). At the 2021 census, Țăndărei had a population of 12,761; of those, 47.39% were Romanians, 9.98% Roma, and 42.51% with undeclared ethnicity.

== Natives ==
- Aurelian Chițu (born 1991), footballer
- Paul Georgescu (1923 – 1989), literary critic, journalist, fiction writer, and communist political figure
- Grigore H. Grandea (1843 – 1897), journalist, poet, and prose writer
- Alexandru Lăpușan (1955 – 2016), politician
