= Vânători, Mehedinți =

Vânători
- Commune
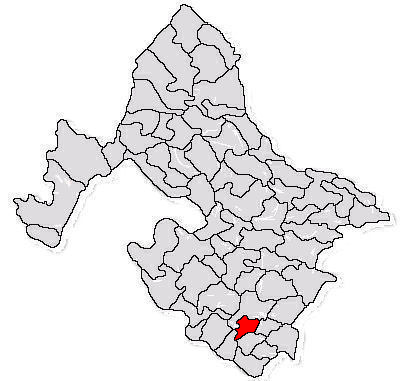
- Location in Mehedinți County

- Location in Romania
- Coordinates: 44°15′N 22°56′E
- Country: Romania
- County: Mehedinți

Government
  - Mayor (2020–2024): Dănuț-Narcis Percea (PSD)
- Area: 48.56 km^{2} (18.75 sq mi)
- Elevation: 79 m (259 ft)
- Population (2021-12-01): 1,922
  - Density: 40/km^{2} (100/sq mi)
- Time zone: EET/EEST (UTC+2/+3)
- Postal code: 227490
- Vehicle reg.: MH
- Website: www.clvinatori.ro

Vânători is a commune located in Mehedinți County, Oltenia, Romania. It is composed of two villages: Roșiori and Vânători. It also included Braniștea and Goanța villages until 2004, when they were split off to form Braniștea Commune.

== Natives ==
- Constantin Ciucă (born 1941), boxer
