= Braniștea, Mehedinți =

Braniștea
- Commune
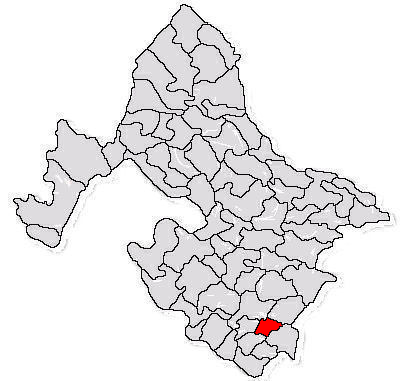
- Location in Mehedinți County

- Location in Romania
- Coordinates: 44°15′N 22°58′E
- Country: Romania
- County: Mehedinți
- Area: 31.18 km^{2} (12.04 sq mi)
- Population (2021-12-01): 1,647
  - Density: 52.82/km^{2} (136.8/sq mi)
- Time zone: UTC+02:00 (EET)
  - Summer (DST): UTC+03:00 (EEST)
- Vehicle reg.: MH

Braniștea is a commune located in Mehedinți County, Romania. It is composed of two villages: Braniștea and Goanța. These were part of Vânători Commune until 2004, when they were split off. Braniștea is situated in the historical region of Oltenia.
