= Valea Mare, Dâmbovița =

Valea Mare
- Commune
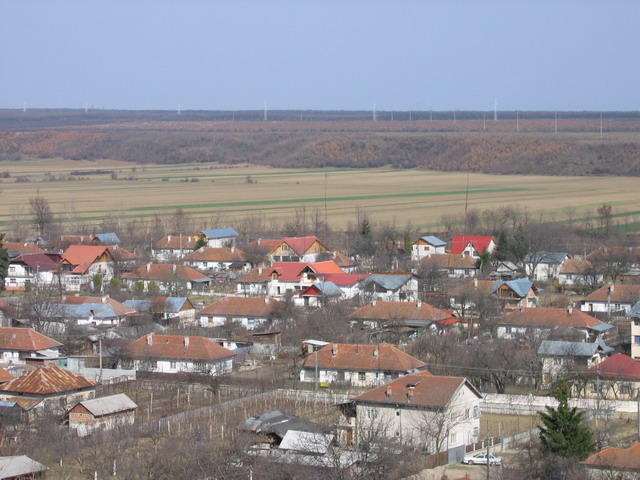

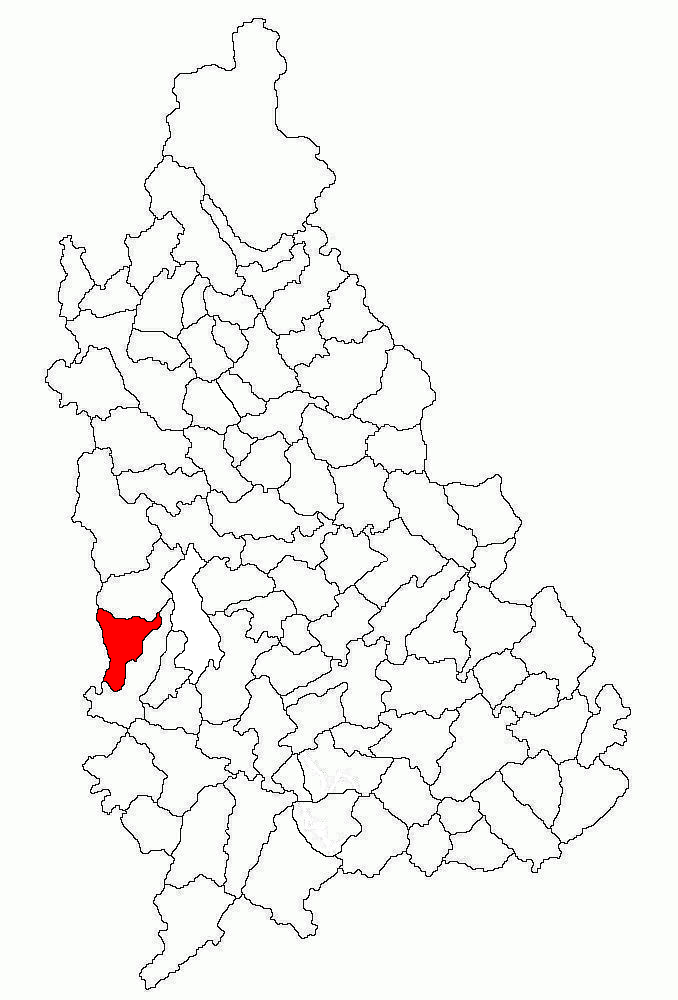
- Location in Dâmbovița County

- Location in Romania
- Coordinates: 44°48′N 25°15′E
- Country: Romania
- County: Dâmbovița

Government
  - Mayor (2024–2028): Ion Constantin Miu (PSD)
- Area: 32.5 km^{2} (12.5 sq mi)
- Elevation: 218 m (715 ft)
- Population (2021-12-01): 2,091
  - Density: 64.3/km^{2} (167/sq mi)
- Time zone: UTC+02:00 (EET)
  - Summer (DST): UTC+03:00 (EEST)
- Postal code: 137485
- Area code: +(40) 245
- Vehicle reg.: DB
- Website: primariavaleamare-db.ro

Valea Mare is a commune in Dâmbovița County, Muntenia, Romania with a population of 2,091 people as of 2021. It is composed of seven villages: Fețeni, Gârleni, Livezile, Saru, Stratonești, Valea Caselor, and Valea Mare.

The commune is situated in the Wallachian Plain, at an altitude of 218 m (715 ft). It is located in the western part of Dâmbovița County, 29 km (18 mi) southwest of the county seat, Târgoviște, on the border with Argeș County. National road DN7 passes through the southern part of Valea Mare, connecting it to Pitești, 34 km (21 mi) to the northwest, and to Bucharest, 85 km (53 mi) to the southeast.

Historical population
Year	Pop.	±%
2002	2,565	—
2011	2,400	−6.4%
2021	2,091	−12.9%
Source: Census data
