= Nelu Tătaru =

Romanian politician (born 1972)

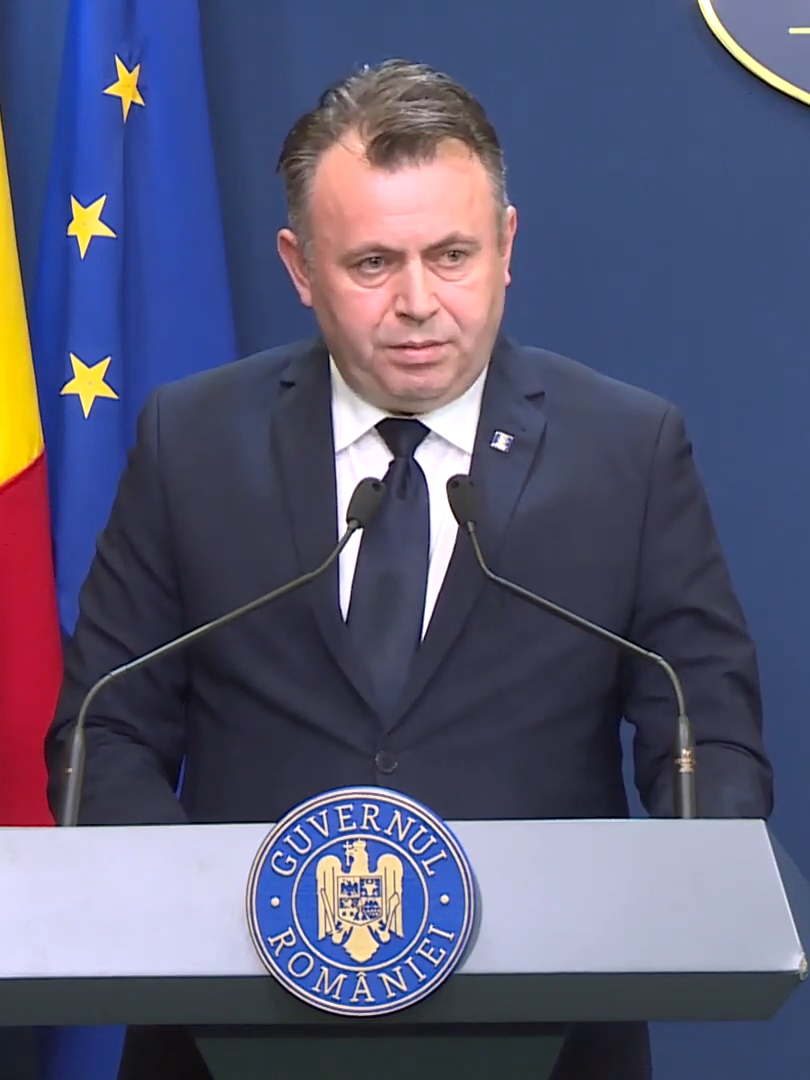

Minister of Health
- In office 26 March 2020 – 23 December 2020
- President: Klaus Iohannis
- Prime Minister: Ludovic Orban
- Preceded by: Victor Costache
- Succeeded by: Vlad Voiculescu

Personal details
- Born: 30 September 1972 (age 54) Vaslui, Romania
- Party: National Liberal Party (PNL)
- Education: Grigore T. Popa University of Medicine and Pharmacy

Nelu Tătaru (born 30 September 1972) is a Romanian politician. He was born in Vaslui and studied medicine at the Grigore T. Popa University of Medicine and Pharmacy in Iași. A member of the National Liberal Party (PNL), he was elected to the Senate in 2012 and served a 4-year term. He served as the Health Minister in the second Orban cabinet.
