= Alexander Rudnay =

Hungarian–Slovak Roman Catholic prelate

His Eminence Alexander Rudnay
- Cardinal Archbishop of Esztergom; Prince Primate of Hungary
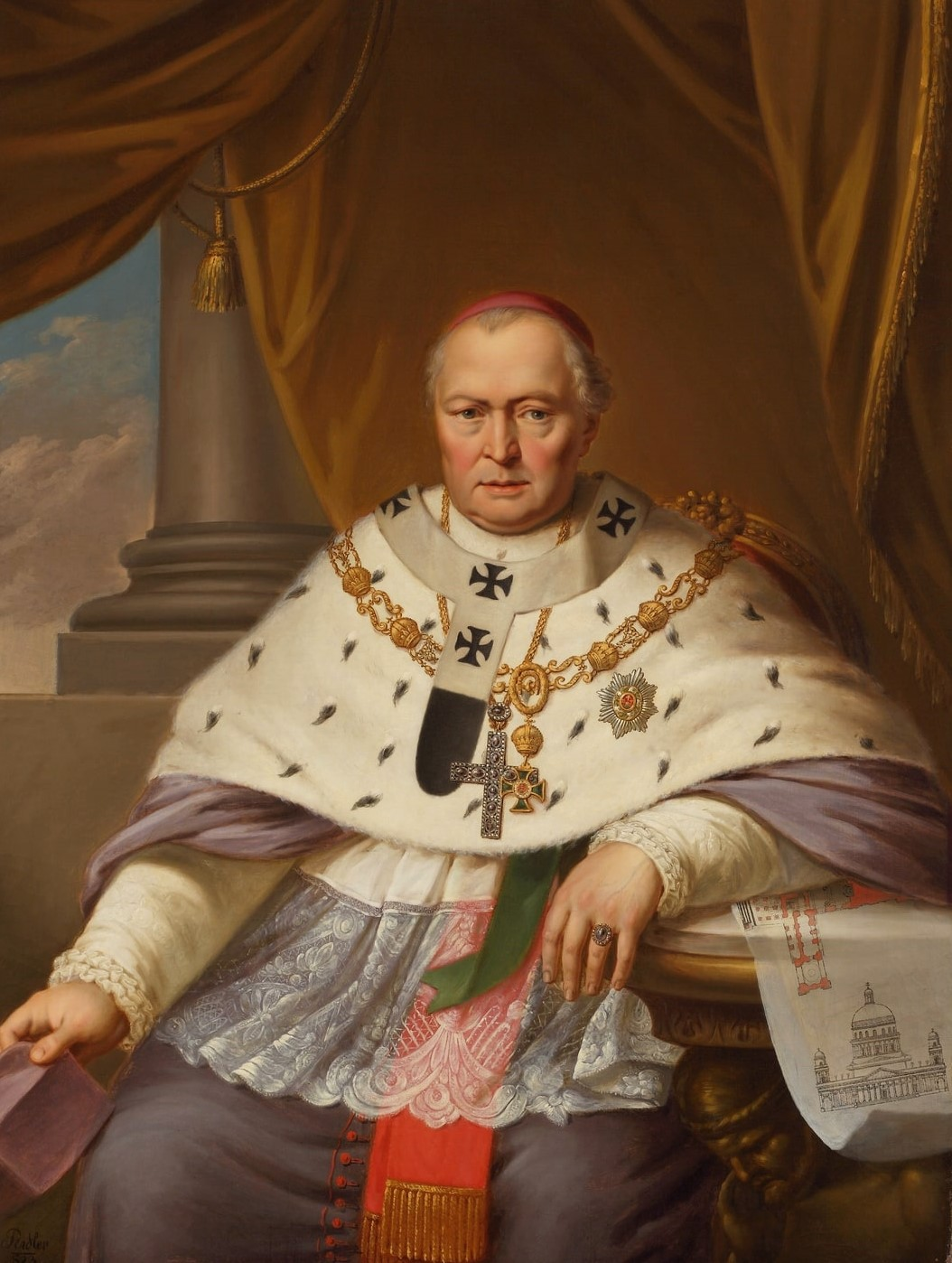
- Appointed: 28 July 1819
- Term ended: 13 September 1831
- Predecessor: Karl Ambrose Ferdinand von Habsburg
- Successor: József Kopácsy
- Previous post: Bishop of Transilvania (1816-1819)

Orders
- Ordination: 12 October 1783
- Consecration: 21 April 1816 by Sigismund Anton von Hohenwart
- Created cardinal: 15 December 1828
- Rank: Cardinal

Personal details
- Born: 4 October 1760 Szentkereszt, Kingdom of Hungary (today Považany, Slovakia)
- Died: 13 September 1831 (aged 70) Esztergom, Kingdom of Hungary
- Buried: Esztergom Basilica
- Denomination: Roman Catholic
- Parents: András Rudnay; Anna Dőry
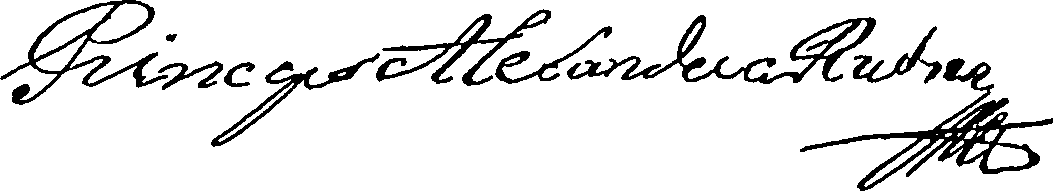
- Signature

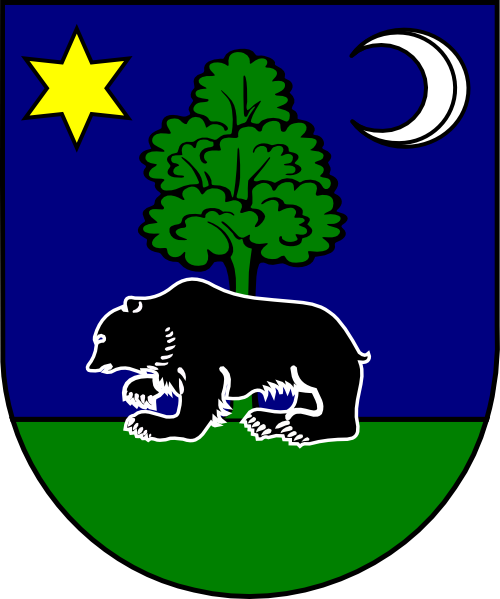
- Coat of arms

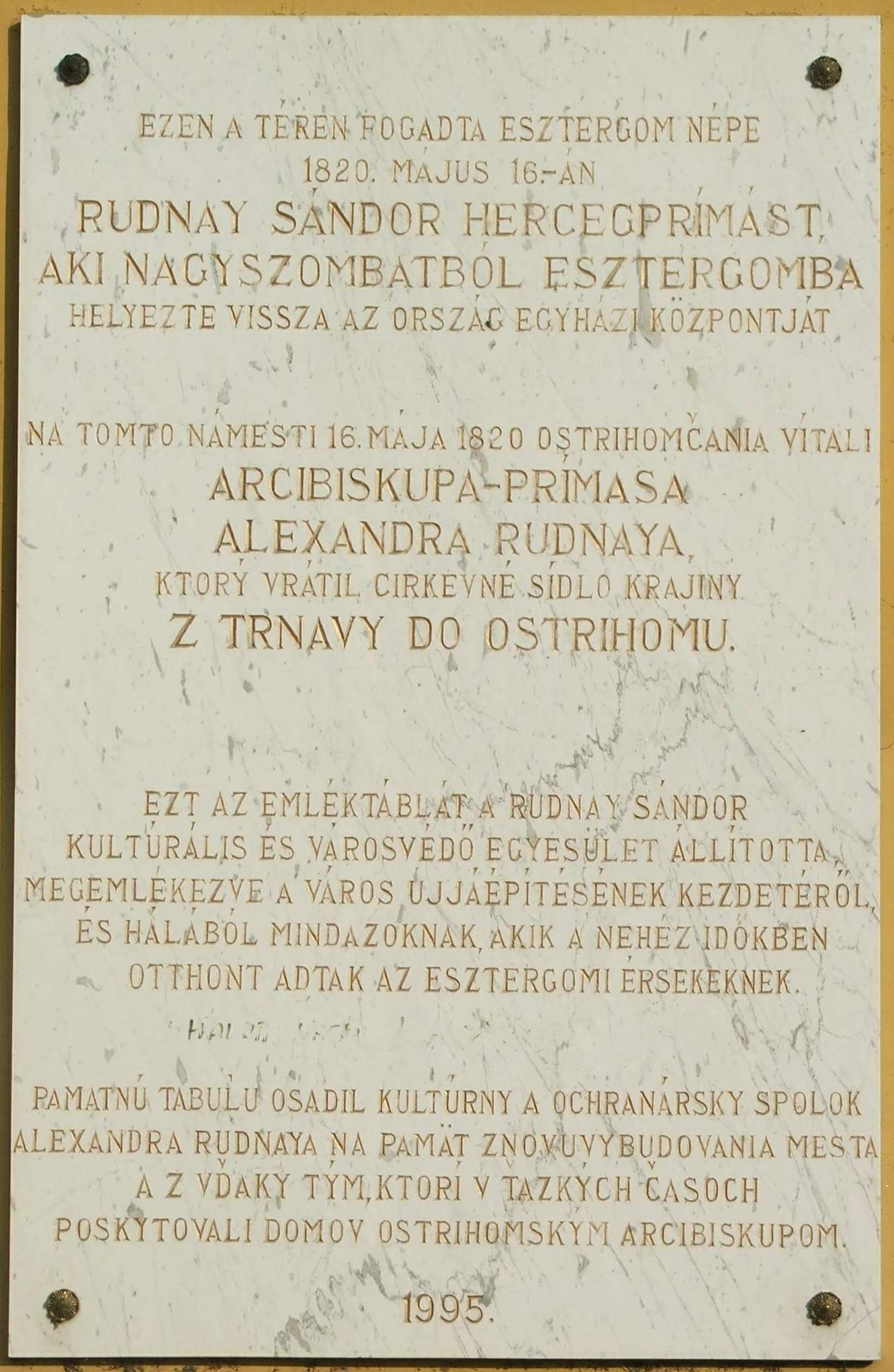
Bilingual (Hungarian and Slovak) plaque in Esztergom

Alexander Stefan Rudnay de Rudna et Divékujfalu (Hungarian: rudnai és divékujfalusi Rudnay Sándor István; 4 October 1760 – 13 September 1831) was a Hungarian–Slovak Roman Catholic prelate. He started as a parish priest, but later he became the Archbishop of Esztergom, the Prince Primate of Hungary and a Cardinal.

== Life ==
Alexander Rudnay was born to a family of lower nobility, which originated from the ancient Hungarian gens (clan) Divék. The Rudnay family also preserved its coat of arms from the genus: a brown bear under an extensive foliage of tee with blue background. His parents were András (Andrej) Rudnay, a servants' judge (Hungarian: szolgabíró; Latin: iudex nobilium) and Anna Dőry. He studied in secondary school (gymnasium) in Nitra (Nyitra), later in Emerican in Pressburg, philosophy in Trnava (Nagyszombat), theology in Buda and, finally, in the general seminary in Pressburg.

He was ordained on October 12, 1783, in Trnava, and in April 1784, he received his doctor degree in theology. In January 1785 started his spiritual career, and he was sent as a chaplain to Častá (Cseszte). Afterwards, he served in Hronský Beňadik (Garamszentbenedek), Trnava and Krušovce (Nyitrakoros). In 1805, he became the canonical clergyman in Esztergom, 1806 rector of the priest seminary in Trnava and, a theology professor, 1808 a titular bishop, a general vicarius in Esztergom, and a viceroy's councilor. He was appointed as the bishop of Transylvania seated in Gyulafehérvár in 1816. In December 1819, Alexander Rudnay obtained the papal bull with his nomination to archbishop of Esztergom and primate of Hungary. Upon the emperor's personal request, he moved his seat 1820 from Trnava to Esztergom. He was further the member of the Table of the Lords, secretary of the royal chancellery, and of the Secret Council. He adhered to the imperial court in Vienna and supported the Slovak culture, especially he saw that Slovak parishes were assigned to Slovak priests. In 1828, Pope Leo XII named him a Cardinal. It is from this period that his most famous statement comes: „Slavus sum, et si in catedra Petri forem, Slavus ero.“ (I am a Slav, and I shall remain Slav, even if I were to sit in the Chair of Saint Peter.).

== Works ==
Inspired by the movement of Enlightenment this progressive clergyman supported the spiritual development of Slovaks and their national revival. In 1822 as archbishop of Esztergom and primas of Hungary, he began the construction of the Esztergom Basilica, personally contributing 815,696 forints. It is also the place of his final rest.

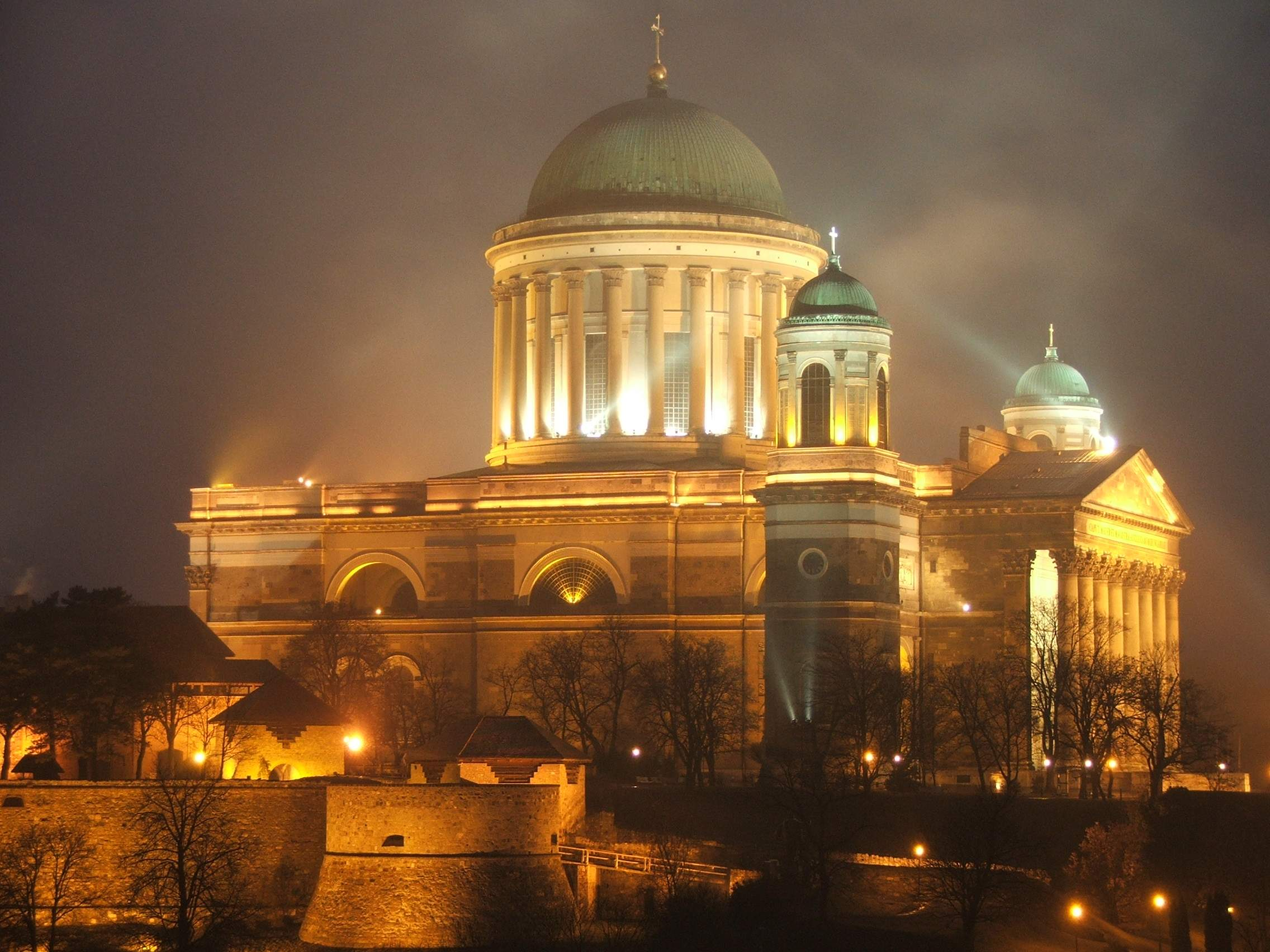
St. Adalbert's Basilica in Esztergom

- Erköltsi Keresztény Oktatások különösen a fenyitö házakban raboskodónak remélhetö megjobbitásokra (Christian Moral Teachings especially for the Betterment of Prisoners), 1819
- Kázne príhodné, ai iné, to gest: 82 reči duchownich.. (Occasional and Other Sermons, i.e.: 82 spiritual speeches...), 1833
- various pastoral letters, speeches, preaching published individually

== Honours ==
- Esztergom, Hungary: One of the main squares of Esztergom named after Sándor Rudnay. His plaque located at the wall of Szent Anna church.
- Váchartyán, Hungary: Suburban estate Rudnaykert ("Rudnay Garden") named after him.
- Bratislava, Slovakia: The square in front of St. Martin's Dome named after him.
- In 2002, the Slovak Postal Office issued a stamp with a face value of 17 crowns in his remembrance.

== See also ==
- Dark Gate

== Sources ==
- Mária Vyvíjalová: Alexander Rudnay, 1998 Vydavateľstvo Matice slovenskej, ISBN 80-7090-493-3
- Markó, László: A magyar állam főméltóságai Szent Istvántól napjainkig: Életrajzi Lexikon (The High Officers of the Hungarian State from Saint Stephen to the Present Days: A Biographical Encyclopedia) (2nd edition); Helikon Kiadó Kft., 2006, Budapest; ISBN 963-547-085-1.
- Rudnay de Rudna und Divék-Ujfalá, Alexander, in Constant von Wurzbach, Biographisches Lexikon des Kaiserthums Oesterreich, 27. Band, Wien 1874.
- Szinnyei József: Magyar írók élete és munkái ("József Szinnyei: Life and works of the Hungarian writers")

Catholic Church titles
Preceded by József Mártonffy	Bishop of Transylvania; 1815–1819	Succeeded by Ignác Szepesy
Preceded by Archduke Karl of Austria-Este	Archbishop of Esztergom; 1819–1831	Succeeded by József Kopácsy
