= Jenő Schönberger =

Romanian cleric and bishop

His Excellency Jenő Schönberger
- Bishop of Satu Mare
- Bishop Schönberger
- Church: Roman Catholic
- Diocese: Roman Catholic Diocese of Satu Mare
- Appointed: 30 April 2003
- Installed: 21 June 2003
- Predecessor: Pál Reizer

Orders
- Ordination: 23 June 1985
- Consecration: 21 June 2003 by György Jakubinyi

Personal details
- Born: June 18, 1959 (age 67) Turulung, Romania

Jenő or Eugen Schönberger (born June 18, 1959) is a Romanian cleric, bishop of the Roman Catholic Diocese of Satu Mare. Born into an ethnic Hungarian family in Turulung (Túrterebes), Satu Mare County, he studied at the Roman Catholic Theological Institute of Alba Iulia before being ordained in 1985. He was assistant priest in Carei, Satu Mare and Baia Mare and parish priest in Petreşti and Satu Mare. From 1997 to 2001, he was spiritual director and professor of liturgics at Alba Iulia. In 2001 he became parish priest at Dorolț, and the following year he was transferred to Sighetu Marmaţiei. In 2003 he was consecrated bishop in the cathedral in Satu Mare by Alba Iulia Archbishop György Jakubinyi.
