= Turulung =

Turulung Túrterebes
- Commune
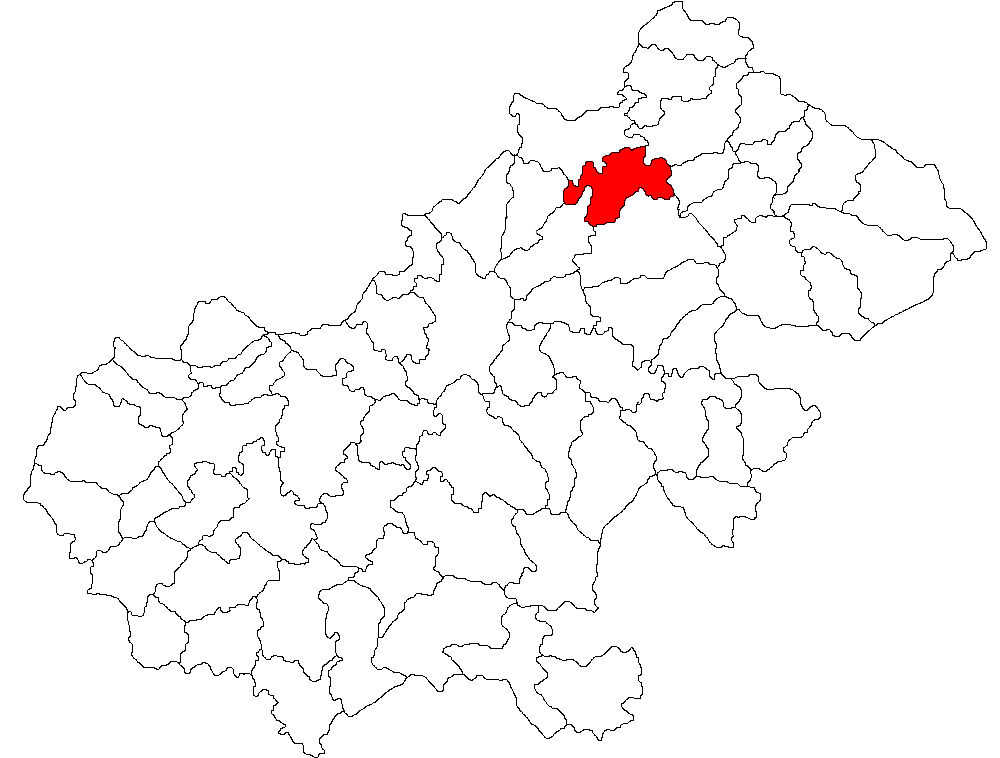
- Location in Satu Mare County

- Location in Romania
- Coordinates: 47°56′N 23°5′E
- Country: Romania
- County: Satu Mare

Government
  - Mayor (2024–2028): Gheorghe-Nicolae Gyákon (FDGR)
- Area: 57.62 km^{2} (22.25 sq mi)
- Elevation: 133 m (436 ft)
- Population (2021-12-01): 3,409
  - Density: 59/km^{2} (150/sq mi)
- Time zone: EET/EEST (UTC+2/+3)
- Postal code: 447335
- Area code: (+40) 02 61
- Vehicle reg.: SM
- Website: primariaturulung.ro

Turulung (Hungarian: Túrterebes, pronounced [ˈtuːrtɛrɛbɛʃ]; Rusyn: Туртеребеш) is a commune of 3,409 inhabitants situated in Satu Mare County, Romania. It is composed of three villages: Drăgușeni (Túrterebestelep), Turulung, and Turulung-Vii (Túrterebesszőlőhegy).

== Geography ==
The commune is situated at an altitude of 133 m (436 ft), on the banks of the Tur River. It is located in the northern part of the county, 27 km (17 mi) northeast of the county seat, Satu Mare. Turulung is crossed by national road DN1C (part of European route E58), which runs from Cluj-Napoca north towards the border crossing at Halmeu (8 km (5 mi) to the northwest), where it connects with the Ukrainian highway M26.

== Demographics ==
At the 2002 census, the commune had a population of 3,845, of which 55.34% Hungarians, 31.88%Romanians, and 9.10% Roma; according to mother tongue, 67.98% of the population spoke Hungarian as first their language, while 31.72% spoke Romanian. At the 2011 census, there were 3,680 inhabitants, of which 59.84% were Hungarians, 26.25% Romanians, 8.72% Roma, and 2.15% Germans. At the 2021 census, Turulung had a population of 3,409 inhabitants, of which 50,04% were Hungarians, 24.38% Romanians, and 14.4% Roma.

Historical population
Year	Pop.	±%
1880	2,476	—
1890	3,178	+28.4%
1900	3,567	+12.2%
1910	3,792	+6.3%
1920	3,468	−8.5%
1930	3,856	+11.2%
1941	4,014	+4.1%
1956	4,555	+13.5%
1966	4,650	+2.1%
1977	4,856	+4.4%
1992	4,142	−14.7%
2002	3,845	−7.2%
2011	3,680	−4.3%
2021	3,409	−7.4%
Source: INS, Census data

== Administration ==
The current local council has the following political composition, based on the results of the votes cast at the 2024 Romanian local elections.

Party	Seats	Current Council
Democratic Forum of Germans in Romania (FDGR/DFDR)	5	
Democratic Alliance of Hungarians in Romania (UDMR/RMDSZ)	5	
National Liberal Party (PNL)	2	
Social Democratic Party (PSD)	1	

== Natives ==
- Ferenc Cserháti (1947–2023), cleric, auxiliary bishop of Roman Catholic Archdiocese of Esztergom–Budapest
- Pál Reizer (1943–2002), cleric, bishop of the Roman Catholic Diocese of Satu Mare
- Jenő Schönberger (born 1959), cleric, bishop of the Roman Catholic Diocese of Satu Mare

== Economy ==
The Livada Solar Park is a large thin-film photovoltaic power system, built on a 135 ha (330 acres) plot of land located between the town of Livada and Drăgușeni village.
