= Racta (river) =

- Location within Romania

Location
- Country: Romania
- Counties: Satu Mare County
- Villages: Iojib, Livada

Physical characteristics
- Mouth: Tur
  - location: Turulung
  - coordinates: 47.9227°N 23.0653°E
- Length: 18 km (11 mi)
- Basin size: 122 km^{2} (47 sq mi)

Basin features
- Progression: Tur→ Tisza→ Danube→ Black Sea
- Tributaries
  - right: Egher

The Racta is a left tributary of the river Tur in Romania. It discharges into the Tur in Turulung. Its length is 18 km (11 mi) and its basin size is 122 km^{2} (47 sq mi).
