= Pál Reizer =

Roman Catholic bishop

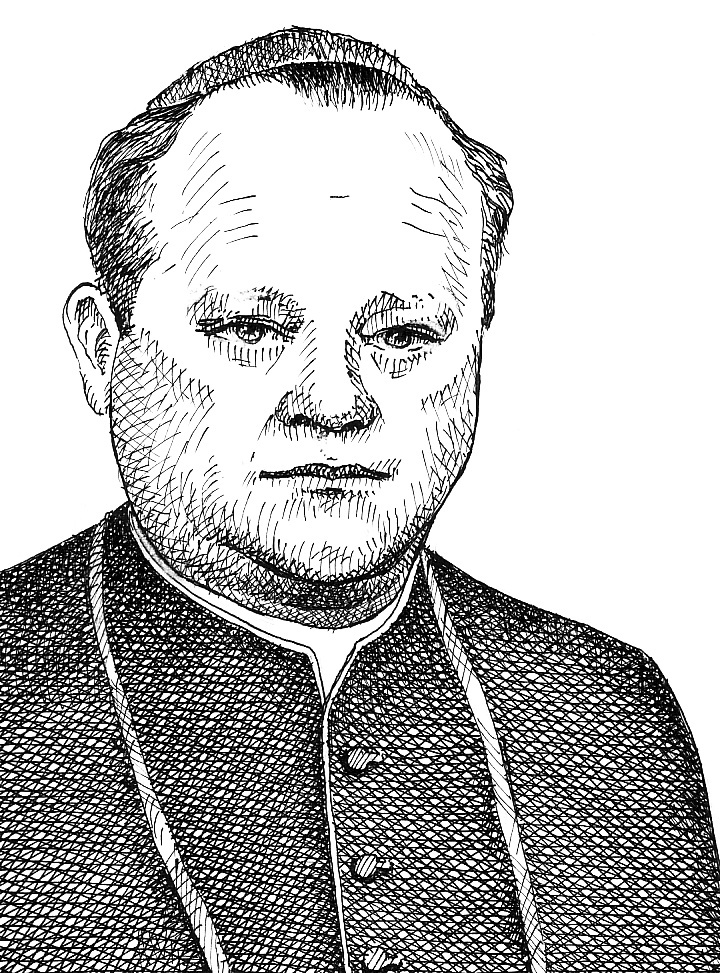
Pál Reizer (1943-2002)

Pál Reizer (January 6, 1943 — April 18, 2002) was a Romanian cleric, bishop of the Roman Catholic Diocese of Satu Mare. Born into an ethnic Hungarian family in Túrterebes (Turulung), Satu Mare County, he studied at the Roman Catholic Theological Institute of Alba Iulia and was ordained a priest in 1967 by Áron Márton. Under the communist regime, he was a chaplain at the parish in Sighetu Marmației, secretary at the Satu Mare diocese and a priest at a nunnery. In 1988, he was named parish priest at Sighetu Marmației. In 1990, after the fall of the regime, he was consecrated a bishop by Francesco Colasuonno, serving until his death. During his years as bishop, the diocese's institutions experienced an intellectual and spiritual revival. He died of diabetes; his funeral was held at the cathedral in Satu Mare and he was buried in the city's Roman Catholic cemetery.
