= Esztergom Basilica =

Ecclesiastic basilica in Esztergom, Hungary

The Primatial Basilica of the Assumption of the Blessed Virgin Mary and St Adalbert
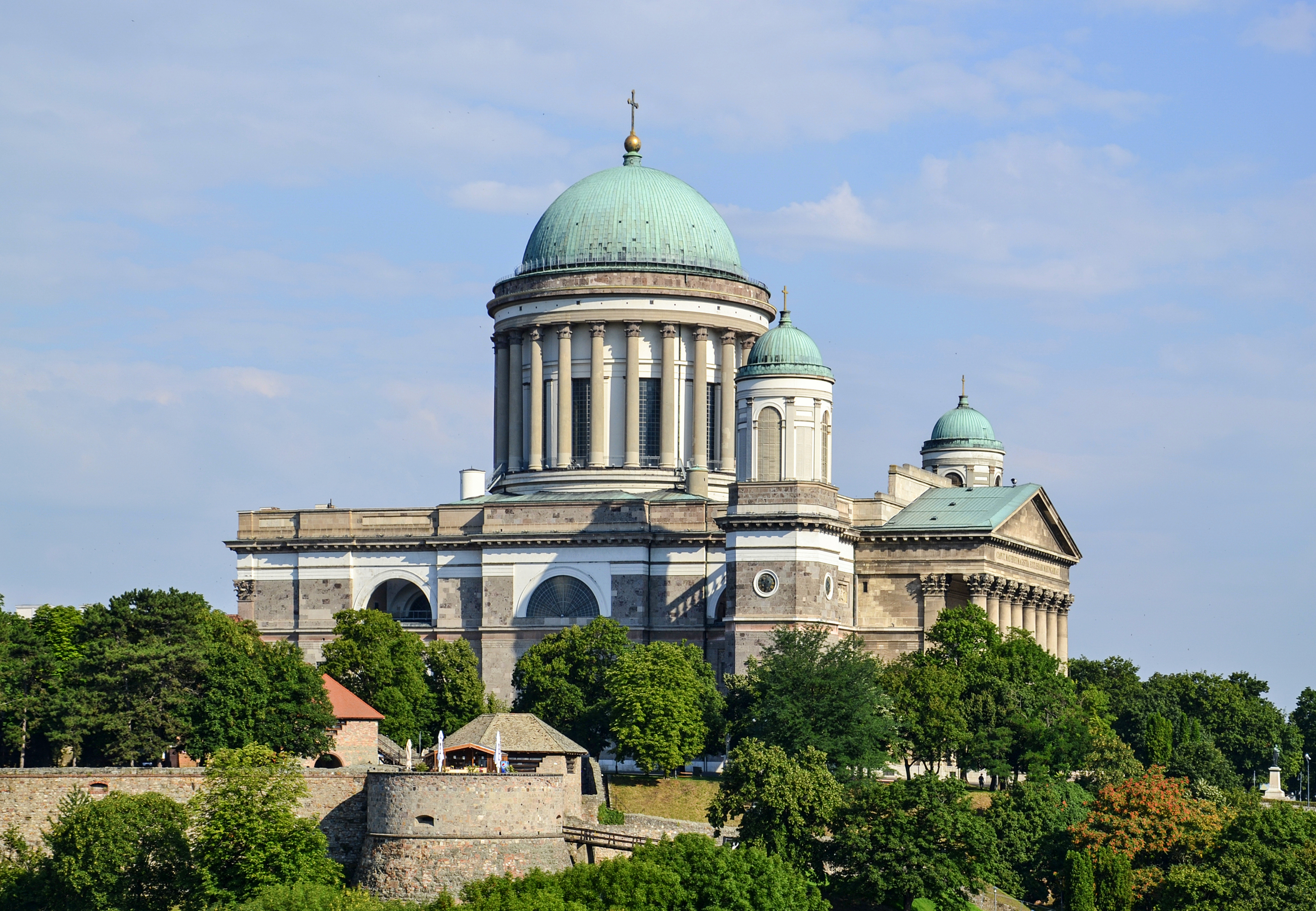
- Basilica in Esztergom, Hungary

Religion
- Affiliation: Catholic Church
- Diocese: Esztergom-Budapest
- Rite: Latin
- Ecclesiastical or organisational status: Cathedral, Primatial Basilica
- Year consecrated: 1856
- Status: active + treasury museum

Location
- Location: Esztergom
- Country: Hungary
- Interactive map of The Primatial Basilica of the Assumption of the Blessed Virgin Mary and St Adalbert
- Coordinates: 47°47′56″N 18°44′11″E

Architecture
- Architects: Pál Kühnel; János Packh; József Hild; József Lippert
- Type: Basilica
- Style: Neoclassical
- Groundbreaking: 1822
- Completed: 1869

Specifications
- Direction of façade: East-Northeast
- Length: 118 m (387 ft 1.7 in)
- Width: 49 m (160 ft 9.1 in)
- Height (max): 100 m (328 ft 1.0 in)
- Dome: 3
- Dome height (inner): 71.5 m (234 ft 7.0 in)
- Dome dia. (outer): 33.5 m (109 ft 10.9 in)

Website
- Website of the Basilica

The Primatial Basilica of the Assumption of the Blessed Virgin Mary and St Adalbert (Hungarian: Nagyboldogasszony és Szent Adalbert prímási főszékesegyház), also known as the Basilica of Esztergom (Hungarian: Esztergomi bazilika), is an ecclesiastic basilica in Esztergom, Hungary, the mother church of the Archdiocese of Esztergom-Budapest, and the seat of the Catholic Church in Hungary. It is dedicated to the Assumption of Saint Mary and Saint Adalbert.

It is the largest church in Hungary. Its inner area is 5,600 m^{2}. It is 118 m long and 49 m wide. It has a reverberation time of more than 9 seconds. Its dome, forming a semi-sphere, is situated in the middle, and it has 12 windows. It is 71.5 m high inside (which makes it one of the tallest domes in the world), with a diameter of 33.5 metres, and is 100 m high from outside, the stairs count 400 steps counted from the crypt.

The huge crypt, built in Old Egyptian style in 1831, is today the resting place of late archbishops, among others, József Mindszenty, famous for his opposition to both Nazi and Communist rule.

== History ==
The present church is built on Castle Hill on the foundation of several earlier churches. The first of these, the Saint Adalbert church, was built by Stephen I of Hungary between 1001 and 1010 to serve as Hungary's first cathedral. It was rebuilt after being burned down in 1180, subsequently surviving the First and Second Mongol invasion of Hungary. However, in 1304, Wenceslaus III, a probable candidate for the Hungarian throne, sacked the castle and the church. It was repaired in the following years. The archbishops of the 14th and 15th century made the church more ornate and added a huge library, the second most significant one in the country. In 1543, following its capture by the Ottomans during a series of wars with the Habsburg monarchy, the cathedral's sanctuary was demolished and the remainder of the building used as a mosque.

In 1820, the Archdiocese was restored and archbishop Sándor Rudnay decided to restore Esztergom's status as mother church of the country. The foundation stone of today's cathedral was laid on April 23, 1822, on the feast of St. Adalbert.

Under archbishop János Scitovszky, the upper church was completed and dedicated on August 31, 1856 in the presence of Emperor Franz Joseph. The 1856 consecration ceremonies featured the premiere of the Missa solennis zur Einweihung der Basilika in Gran (Gran Mass), composed and conducted by Franz Liszt, and featuring the organist Alexander Winterberger. The piece had been commissioned by the Archbishop.

During World War II the colonnade and the cupola were damaged by bombing.

The church maintains the relics of Catholic martyr and saint Marko Krizin.

Extensive renovations began on the Basilica in 2019 and are expected to continue until 2025. Work on the main entrance was completed in 2020. A special method of scaffolding was used so as not to impede religious services.

== Architecture ==
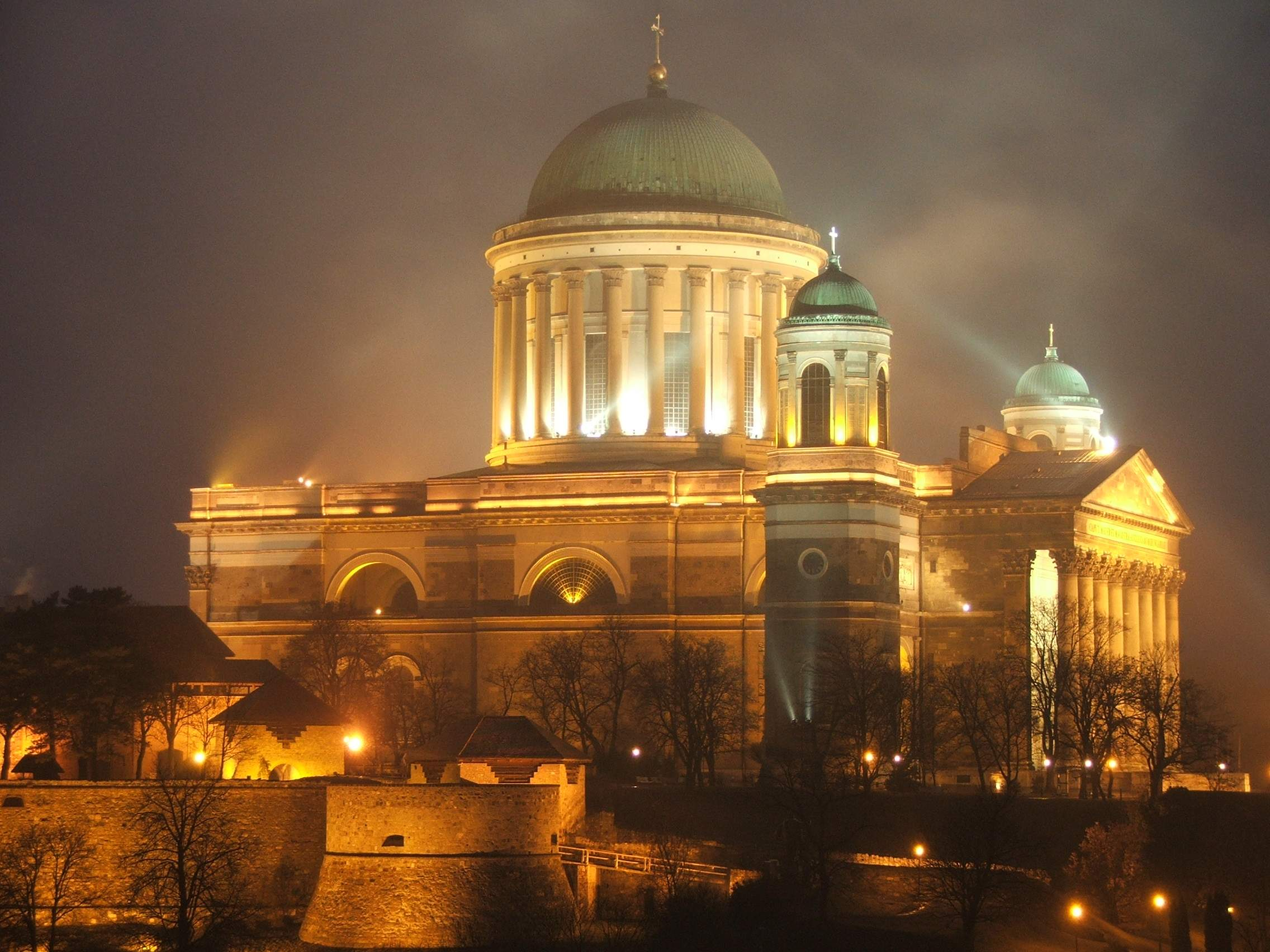
View of the cathedral from St. Thomas Hill

The architect was Pál Kühnel and the lead contractor was his nephew, János Packh. Because of the topography, main facade faces east. The foundation-stone was laid and work began in 1822. After Packh's murder in 1839, József Hild was placed in charge of construction. In 1846, the cross was placed on the dome. Hild completed the building in Classicist style in 1869.

== Interior ==
The altarpiece (13.5 × 6.6 metres) by Girolamo Michelangelo Grigoletti, depicts the Assumption of the Blessed Virgin Mary. It was commissioned by Archbishop József Kopácsy.

The Cathedral Treasury is on the first floor. It opened in 1886 with the aim of preserving and displaying the liturgical instruments once used in the cathedral. It contains the "Matthias' Calvary", a 15th-century golden cross for coronation oath from the Árpád era. Pope John Paul II used the Suki chalice for the Holy Mass, when he visited Esztergom in 1991.

The basilica is also known for Bakócz Chapel (named after Tamás Bakócz), built by Italian masters between 1506–1507 out of red marble of Süttő, its walls adorned with Tuscan Renaissance motifs. In 1823, the chapel was carefully disassembled (into about 1,600 pieces) and moved 20 metres away from its original location and attached to the new basilica. It is the most precious remaining example of Renaissance art in Hungary.

A long staircases to the dome affords a panoramic view of the city.

== The organ ==
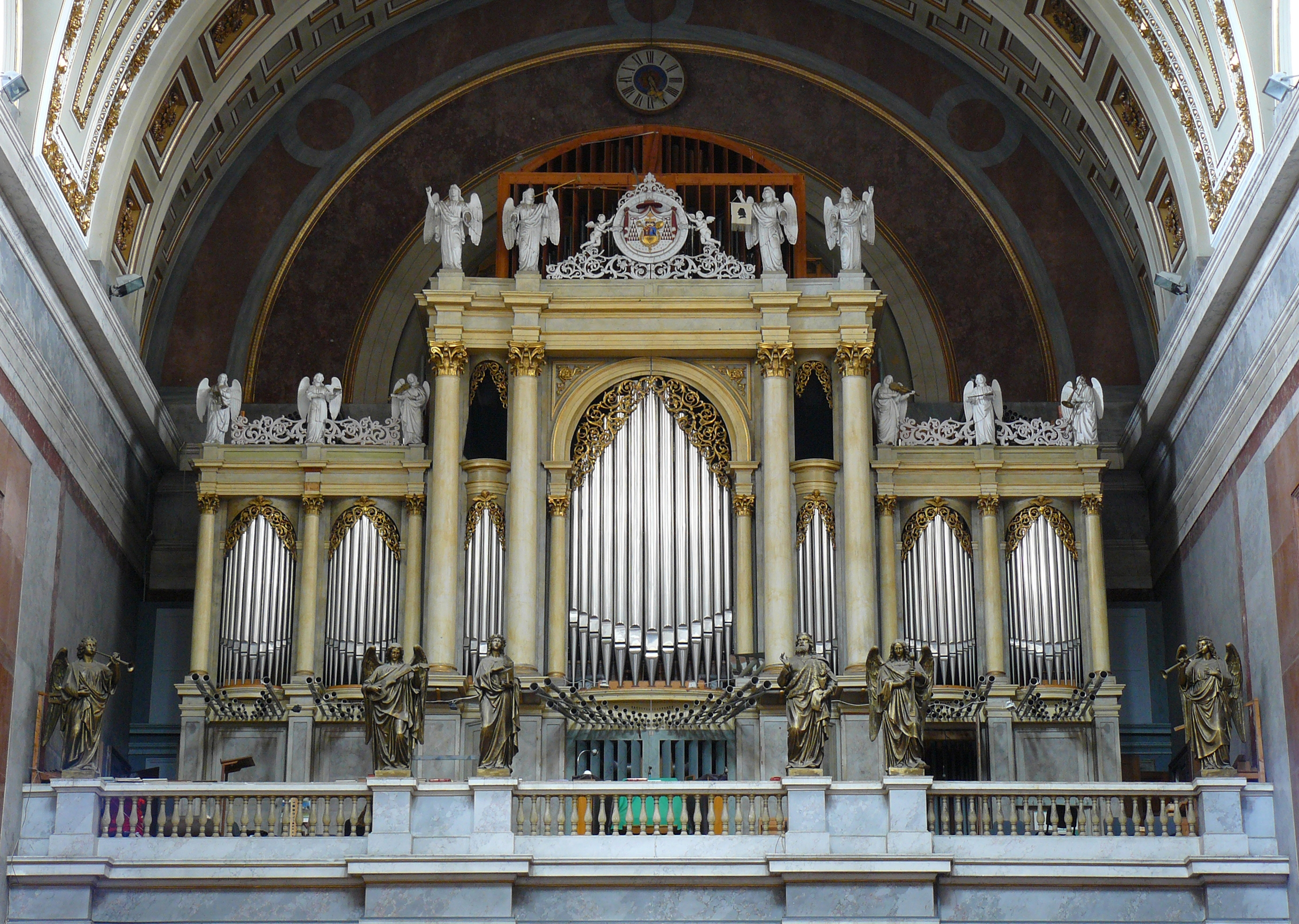
The organ in Esztergom Basilica

The renovation and enlargement of the organ started in the 1980s, after extensive preparations, and it is currently in progress. It is supervised by István Baróti, the basilica's organist and choirmaster since 1975. As of 2008, the project is still not fully funded. The organ has five manuals and by 2006 had 85 stops working out of the planned 146. The organ contains the largest organ pipes in Hungary, 10 m, about 35 feet (11 m) long. The smallest pipe is 7 mm, ¼ inch (without pipe foot). When complete, it will be the third largest organ in Europe, surpassing all organs in Hungary in both volume and variety of stops.

At the time of the construction in 1856, the organ was the largest in Hungary with 49 stops, 3,530 pipes and 3 manuals. The present organ preserves several stops from the instrument Liszt played.

For the organ's detailed specifications, see the article in the Hungarian Wikipedia.

== Burials ==
- József Mindszenty
- Tamás Bakócz and his family
- Jusztinián György Serédi
- Alexander Rudnay
- Dénes Szécsi
- János Scitovszky

== Gallery ==
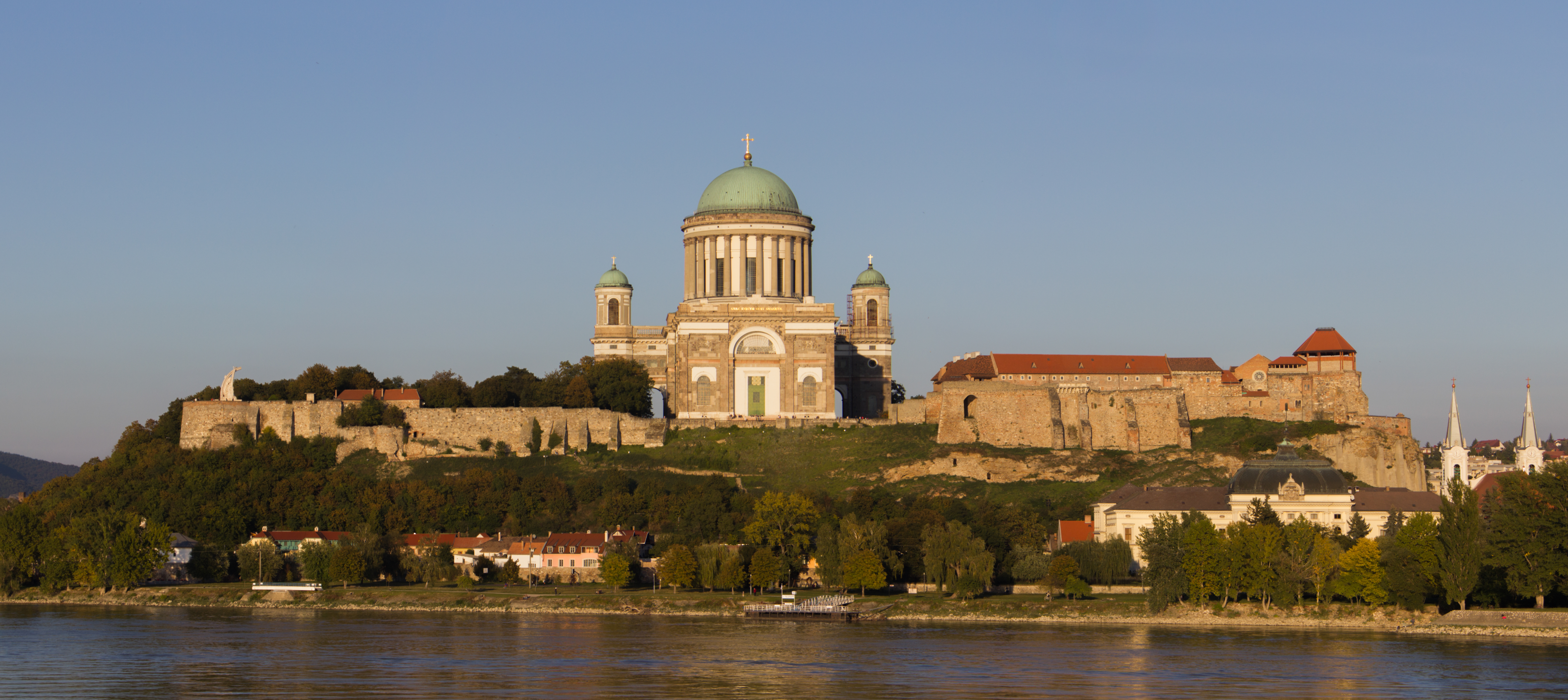
Castle Hill panorama from Štúrovo, Slovakia

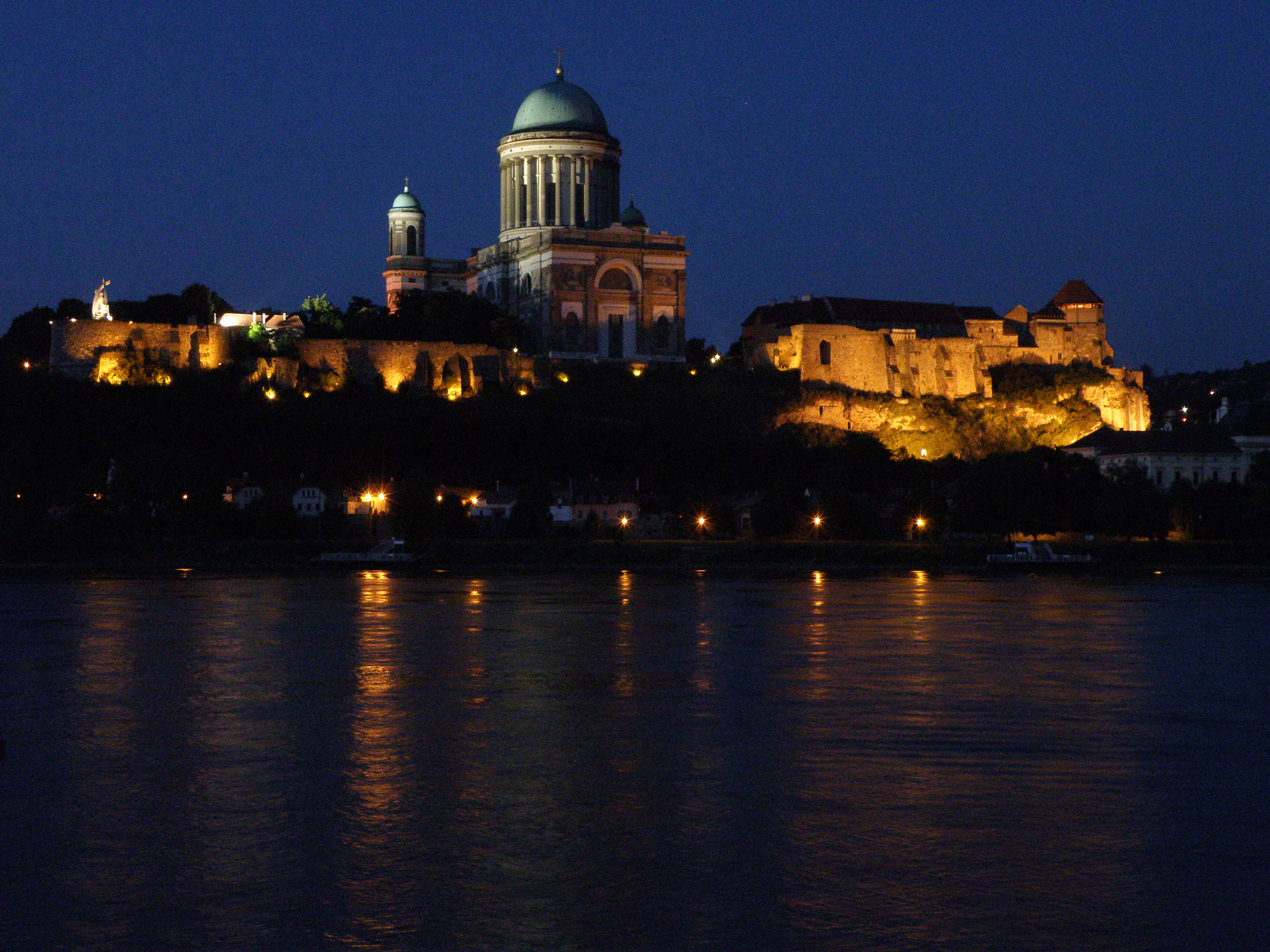
View from the Danube River

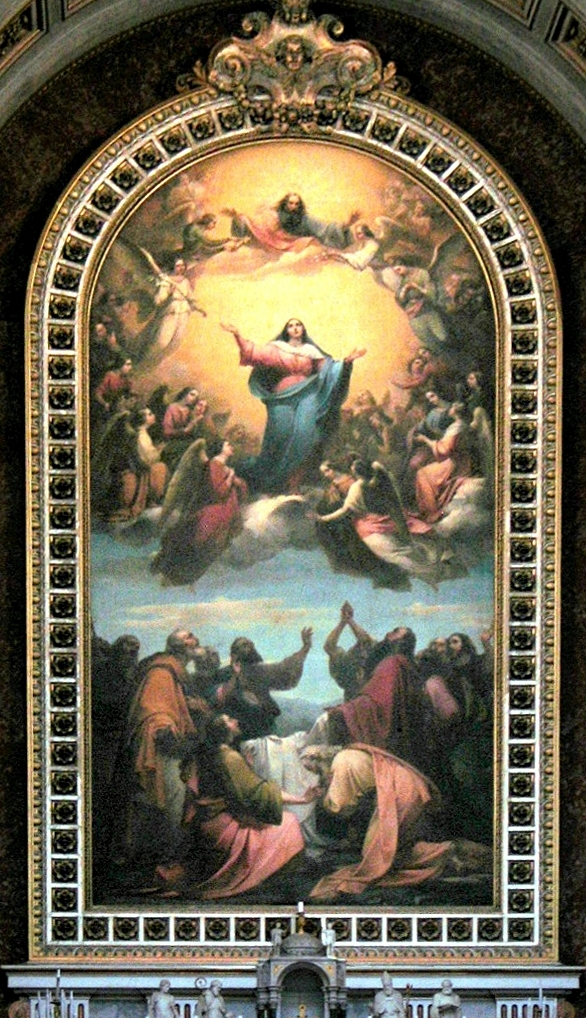
Assumption by Grigoletti

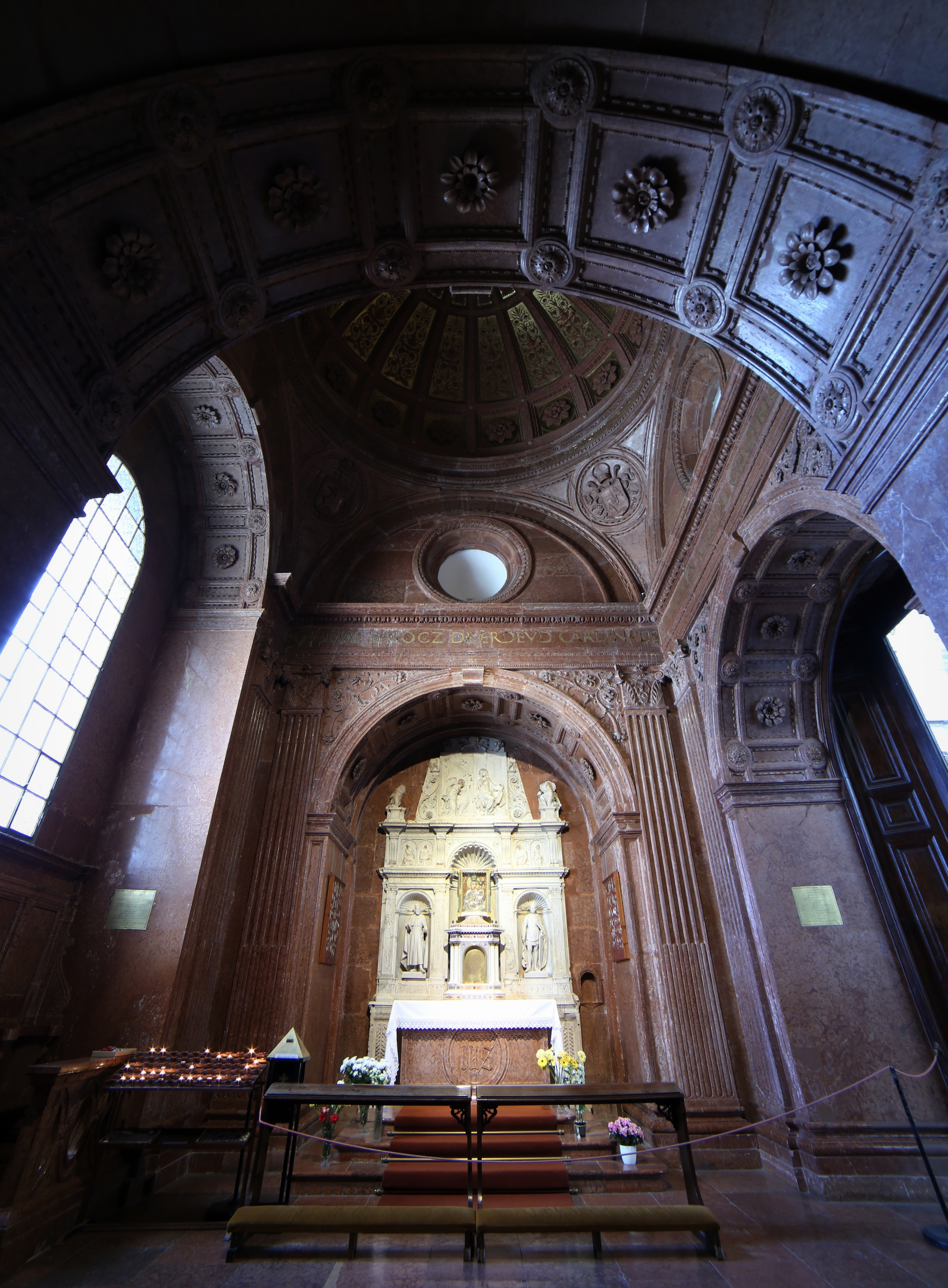
Bakócz Chapel (1506–1507)

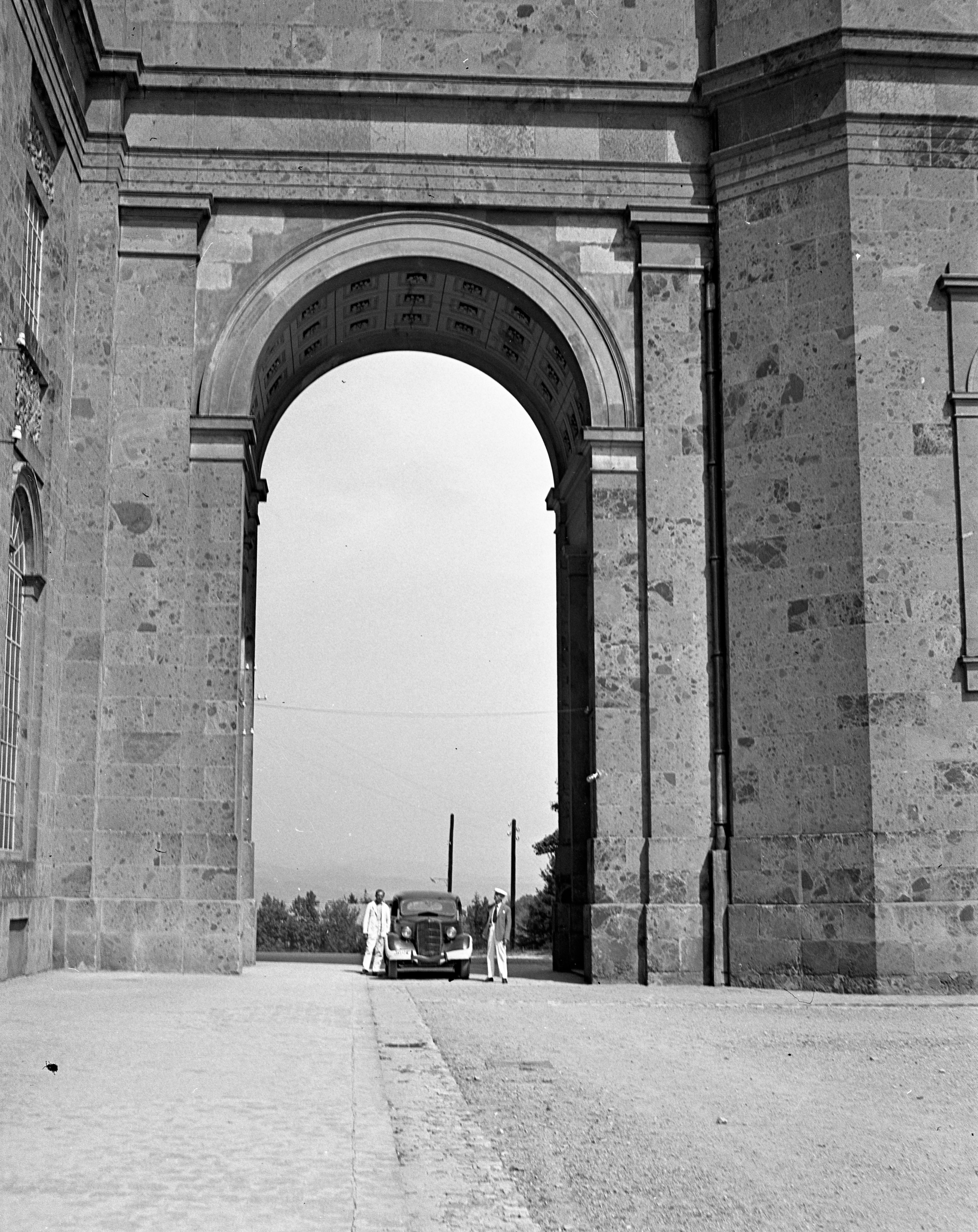
One of the Basilica's arches.

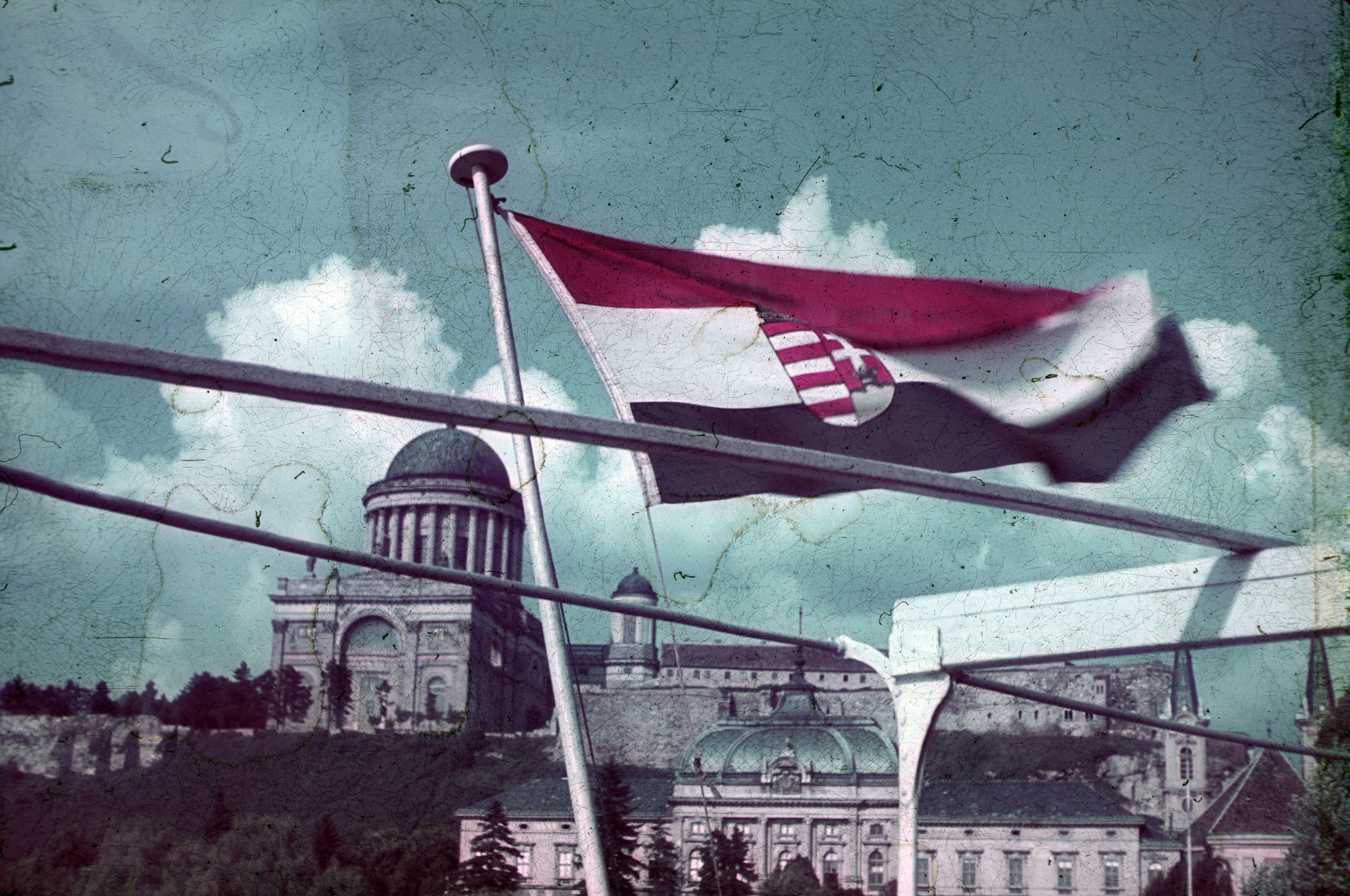
Esztergom Basilica in 1940

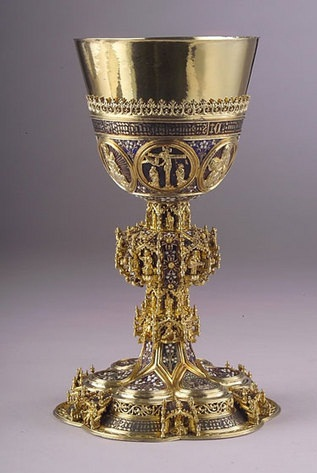
Suki chalice

== See also ==
- Dark gate
- Roman Catholicism in Hungary
- List of cathedrals in Hungary
- List of tallest domes
