= Dark Gate =

Tunnel in Esztergom, Hungary

Coordinates: 47°47′58.4″N 18°44′16″E

The Dark Gate (or alternatively Dark Portal, Hungarian: Sötétkapu) is a tunnel located under the artificial slopes of Castle Hill near St. Adalbert's Basilica in Esztergom, Hungary.

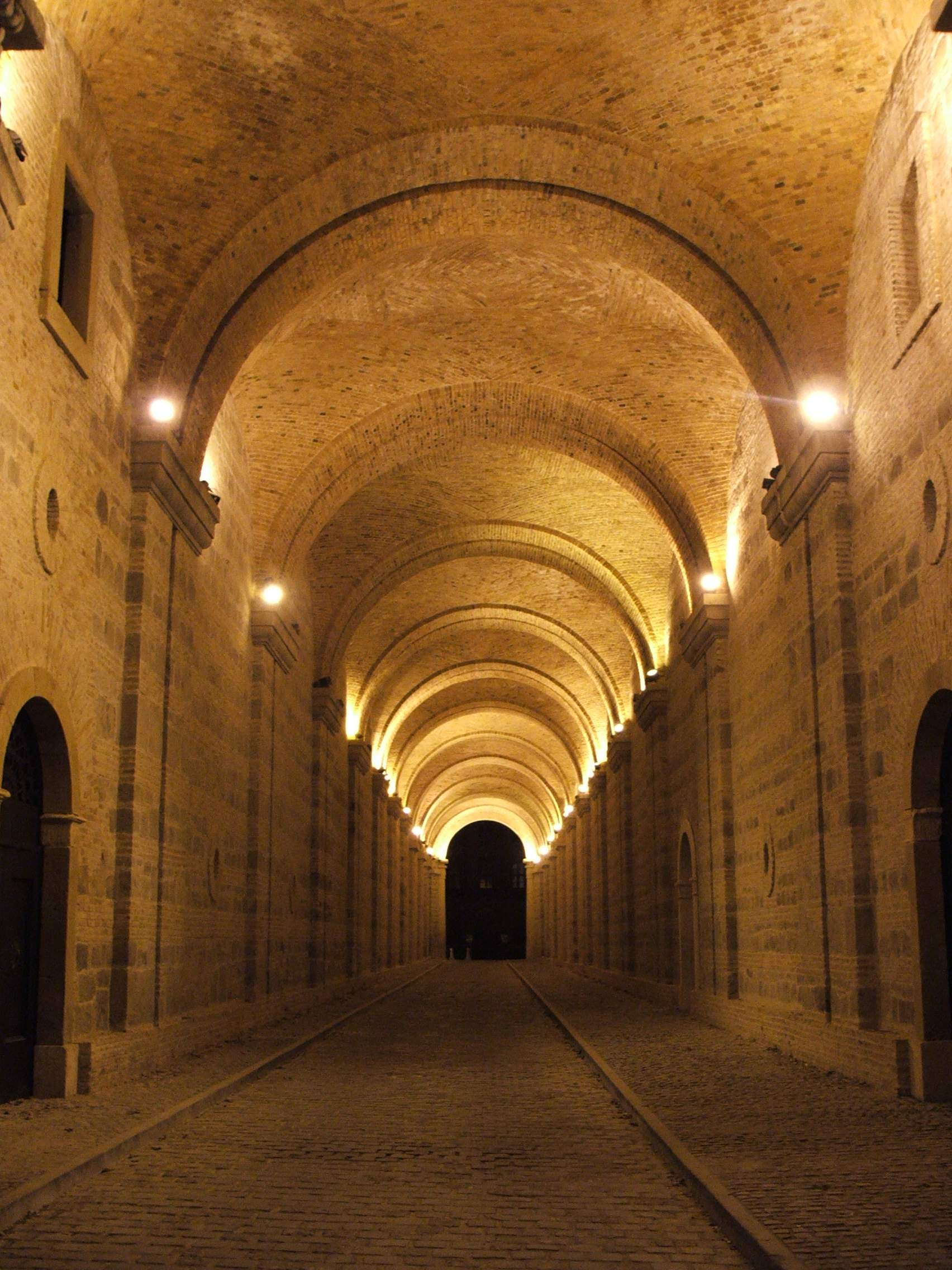
The Dark Gate at night

The tunnel is 90 metres long and follows the line of the castle's former eastern walls. The entire tunnel is vaulted and built in Neo-classical style.

== History ==
Construction of the Dark Gate started in 1824 by Alexander Rudnay, Archbishop of Esztergom, two years after the foundation stones of St. Adalbert's Basilica were laid. It became known as Dark Gate due to the lack of lighting. The main purpose of the tunnel was to directly connect the canonic houses with the seminary, but it also connects the Szentgyörgymező neighborhood with downtown Esztergom. Above the southern entrance, a Latin sign carved in red marble commemorates Archbishop Rudnay and the year of construction: "PRINCEPS PRIMAS ALEXANDER A RUDNA MDCCCXXIV" ("Prince Primate Alexander Rudnay 1824"). From both sides of the tunnel, a huge 3700 m^{2} wine cellar opens, where the wines of the Archdiocese of Esztergom were kept.

During the 1956 revolution, significant events occurred in Esztergom. On 26 October 1956, fourteen people died in the Dark Gate when a T-34 tank shot into a bus heading towards the seminary, which was used as a Russian military facility at the time.

The Dark Gate, the seminary, and its surroundings were completely renovated by 2006, the 150th anniversary of the dedication of the cathedral. Architectural lighting was added to both the basilica and the tunnel. One-way traffic is allowed from the seminary to downtown Esztergom.

== Gallery ==
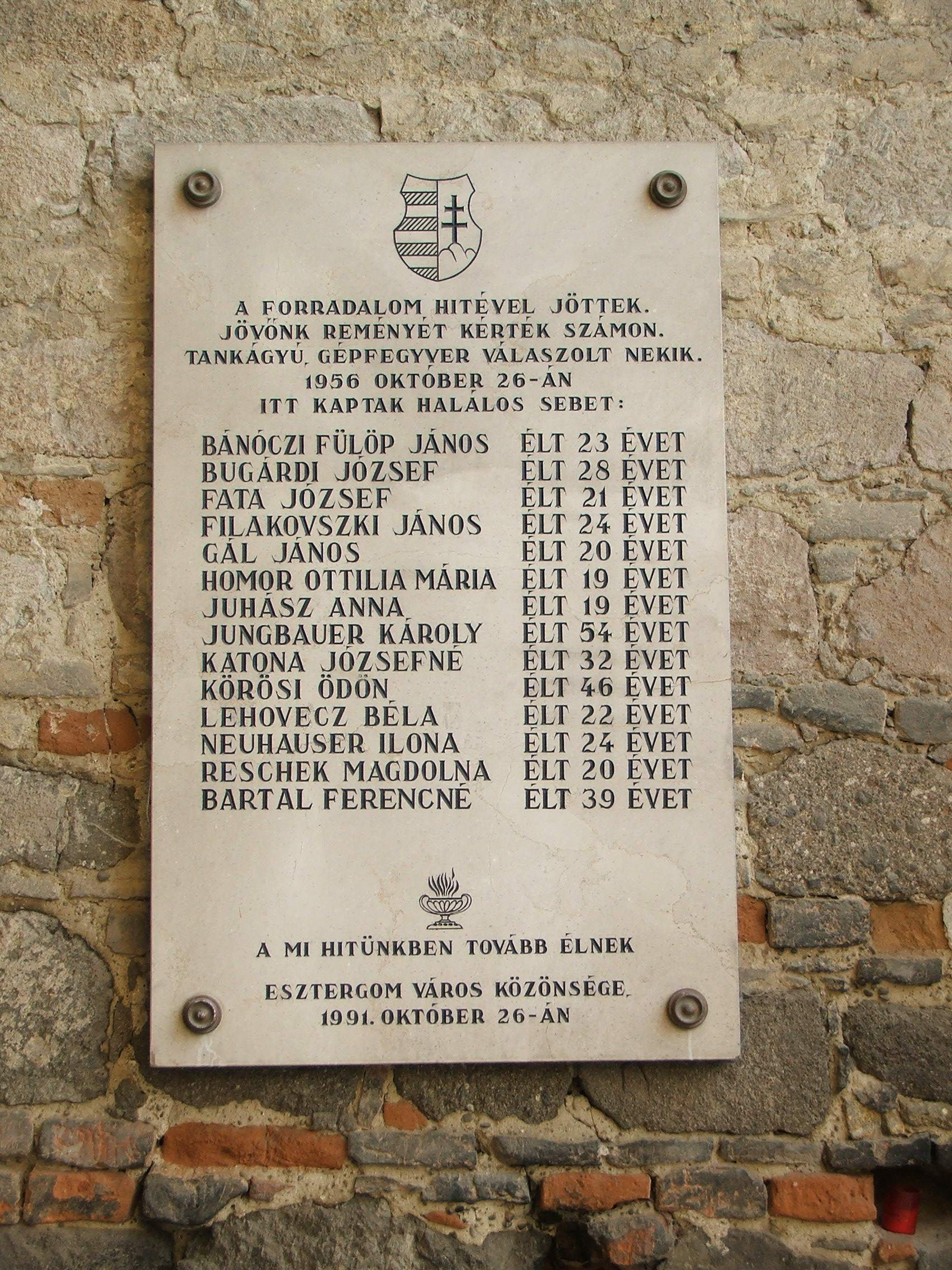
Commemorative plaque with the names of people who died in 1956 in the tunnel

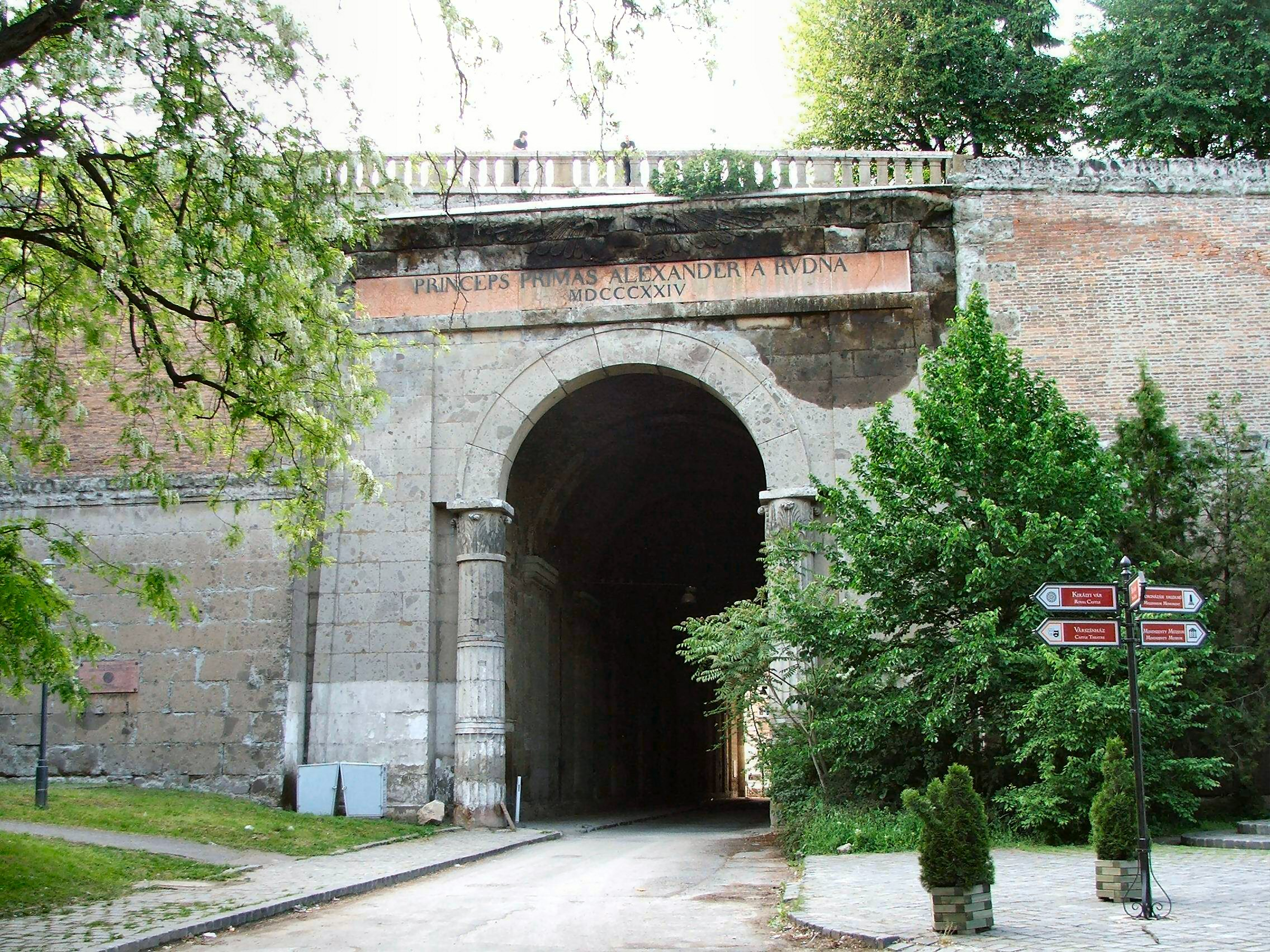
The southern entrance from downtown

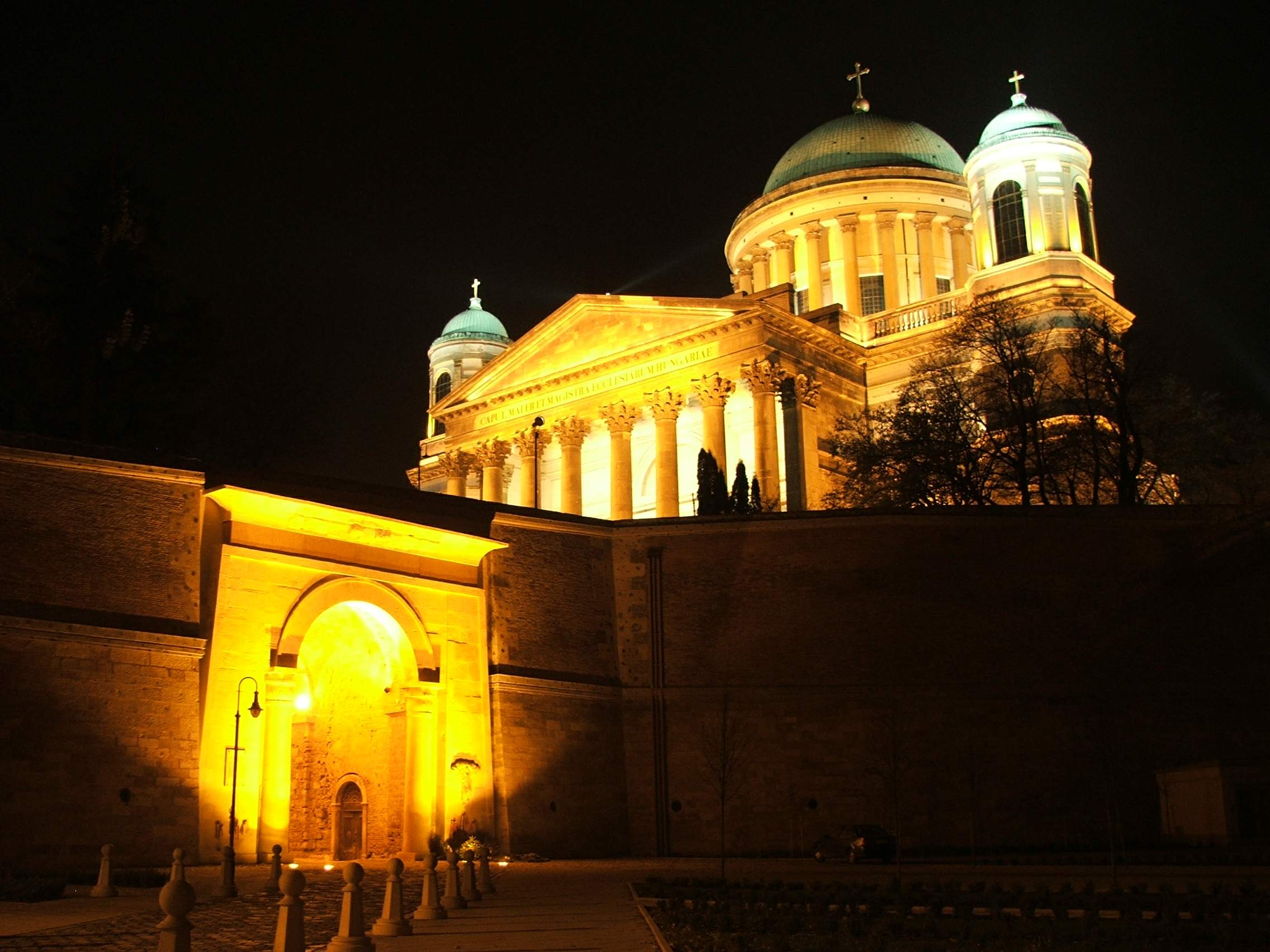
The cathedral and the northern entrance

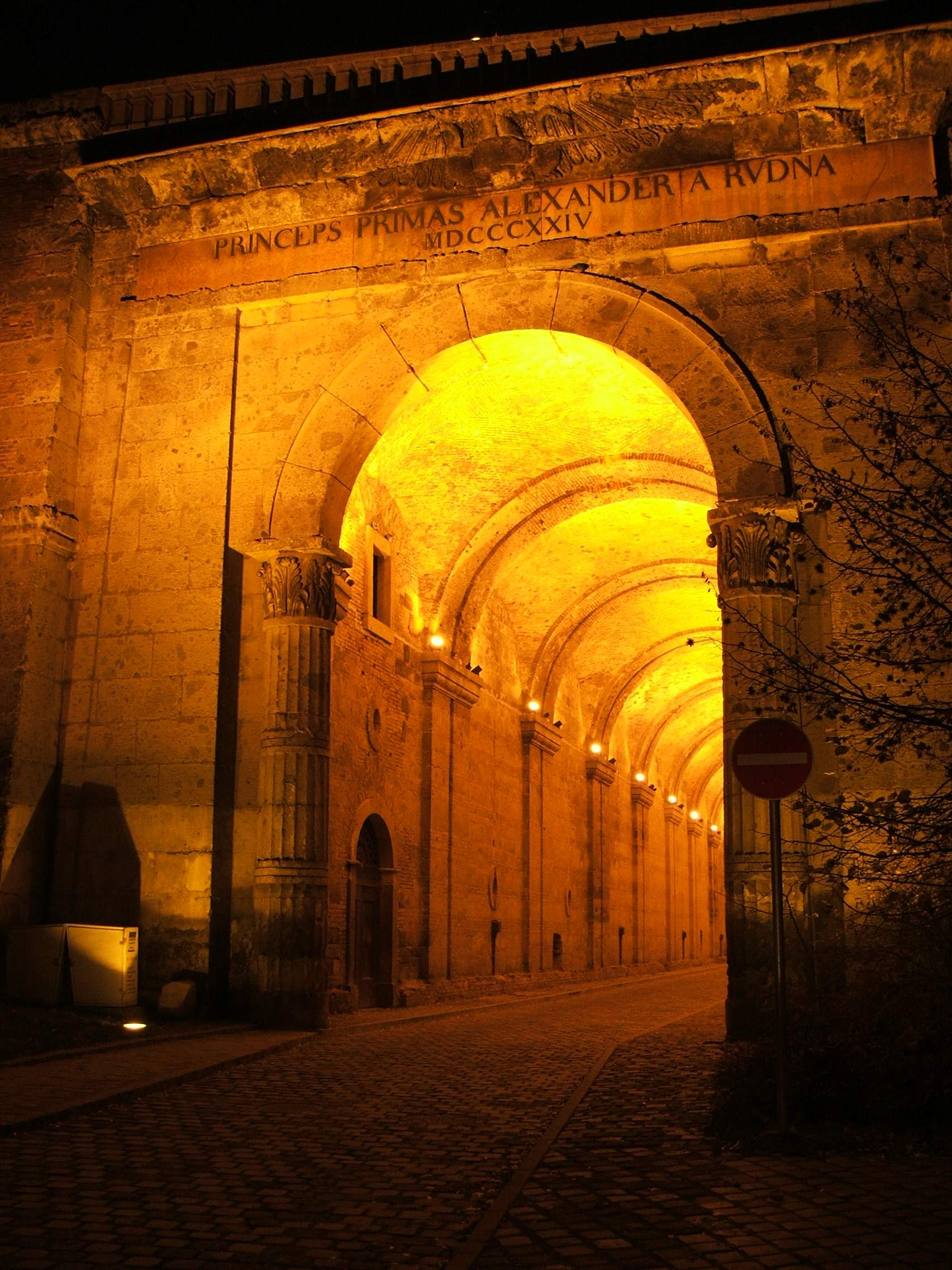
A door to the wine cellar at the end of the tunnel

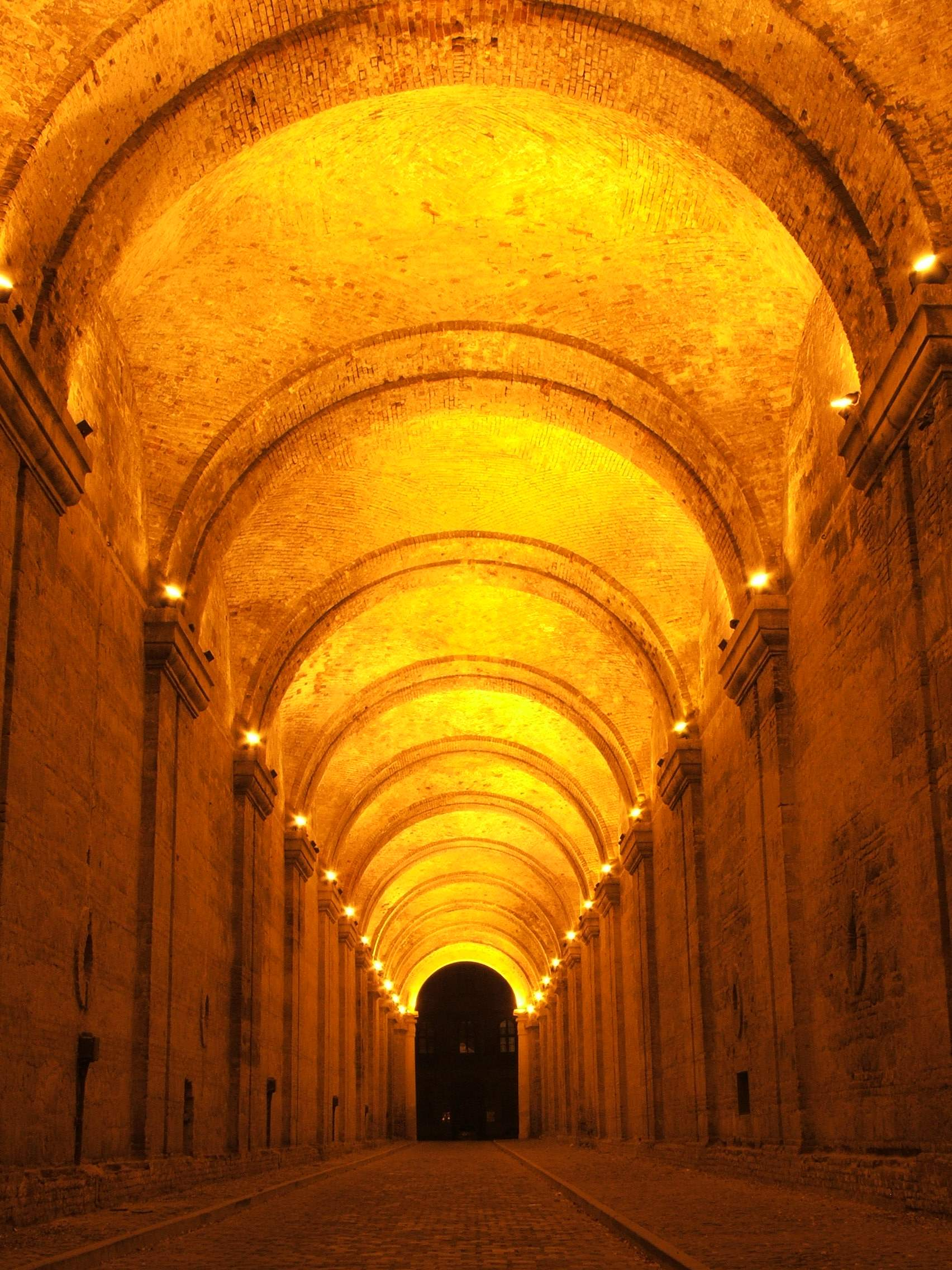
