= Livada Solar Park =

Large thin-film photovoltaic

- Country: Romania
- Location: Livada
- Coordinates: 47°52′N 23°8′E
- Status: Completed
- Commission date: 2013
- Construction cost: €65 million
- Owner: Bester Generation

Solar farm
- Type: Flat-panel PV

Power generation
- Units operational: 230,000
- Nameplate capacity: 56 MW
- Annual net output: 33.6 GWh

Livada Solar Park is a large thin-film photovoltaic (PV) power system, built on a 135 ha (330 acres) plot of land located between Livada and Drăgușeni in Romania. The solar park has around 230,000 state-of-the-art thin film PV panels for a total nameplate capacity of 56-megawatts, and was finished in November 2013. The solar park is expected to supply around 33.6 GWh of electricity per year enough to power some 60,000 average homes.

The installation is located in the Satu Mare County in north-western Romania, between the city of Livada and the village of Drăgușeni. The investment cost for the Livada solar park amounts to some Euro 65 million.

== See also ==
- Energy policy of the European Union
- Photovoltaics
- Renewable energy commercialization
- Renewable energy in the European Union
- Solar power in Romania
