= Egher (Tur) =

- Location within Romania

Location
- Country: Romania
- Counties: Satu Mare County
- Villages: Medieș-Râturi

Physical characteristics
- Mouth: Racta
  - location: Adrian
  - coordinates: 47.8917°N 23.1285°E
- Length: 26 km (16 mi)
- Basin size: 85 km^{2} (33 sq mi)

Basin features
- Progression: Racta→ Tur→ Tisza→ Danube→ Black Sea

The Egher is a right tributary of the river Racta in Romania. It flows into the Racta in Adrian. Its length is 26 km (16 mi) and its basin size is 85 km^{2} (33 sq mi).
