= József Hild =

Hungarian architect (1789–1867)

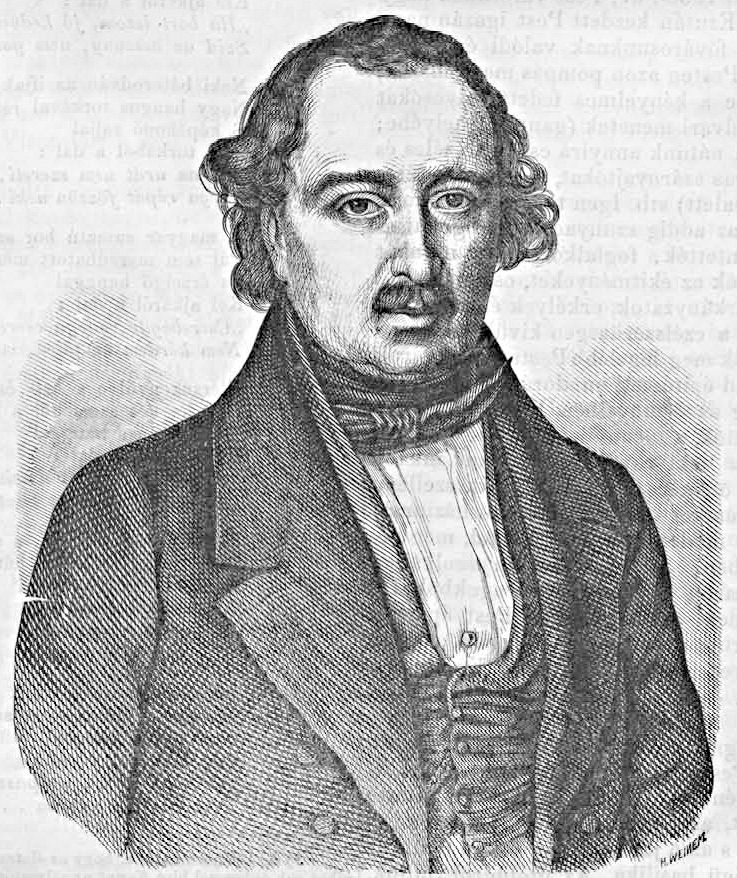
- Born: Josef Hild; 8 December 1789; Pest, Kingdom of Hungary
- Died: 6 March 1867; Pest, Kingdom of Hungary
- Education: TU Wien
- Occupation: Architect
- Practice: Charles de Moreau; Mihály Pollack

József Hild (born Josef Hild, 8 December 1789 – 6 March 1867) was a Hungarian-German architect. One of the major exponents of neoclassical architecture of the time, he played an important part in the remodelling of Pest during the so-called reform era (early 19th century).

== Life and career ==
Hild gained an early interest in architecture through his father, János Hild, a Bohemian construction engineer, and was on building sites beside his father at a very young age. József attended the Piarists’ grammar school, and then studied at the Academy of Fine Arts Vienna while working as court architect for the Esterhazy family. There he worked under Charles de Moreau in Kismarton and Vienna. Following his father's death in 1811, he interrupted his studies but applied to become a master builder which was granted pending he gain further experience. This led him to travel to Italy in 1816, where he completed further studies in Naples, Rome, Florence and Milan. He returned to Pest in 1820 and started his own business, slowly building up a reputation which was to culminate in the rebuilding of Pest following the floods of 1838. He was so busy that it was not until 1844 he completed the requirements to become a master builder; from 1845 to 1861 he was city architect of Pest.

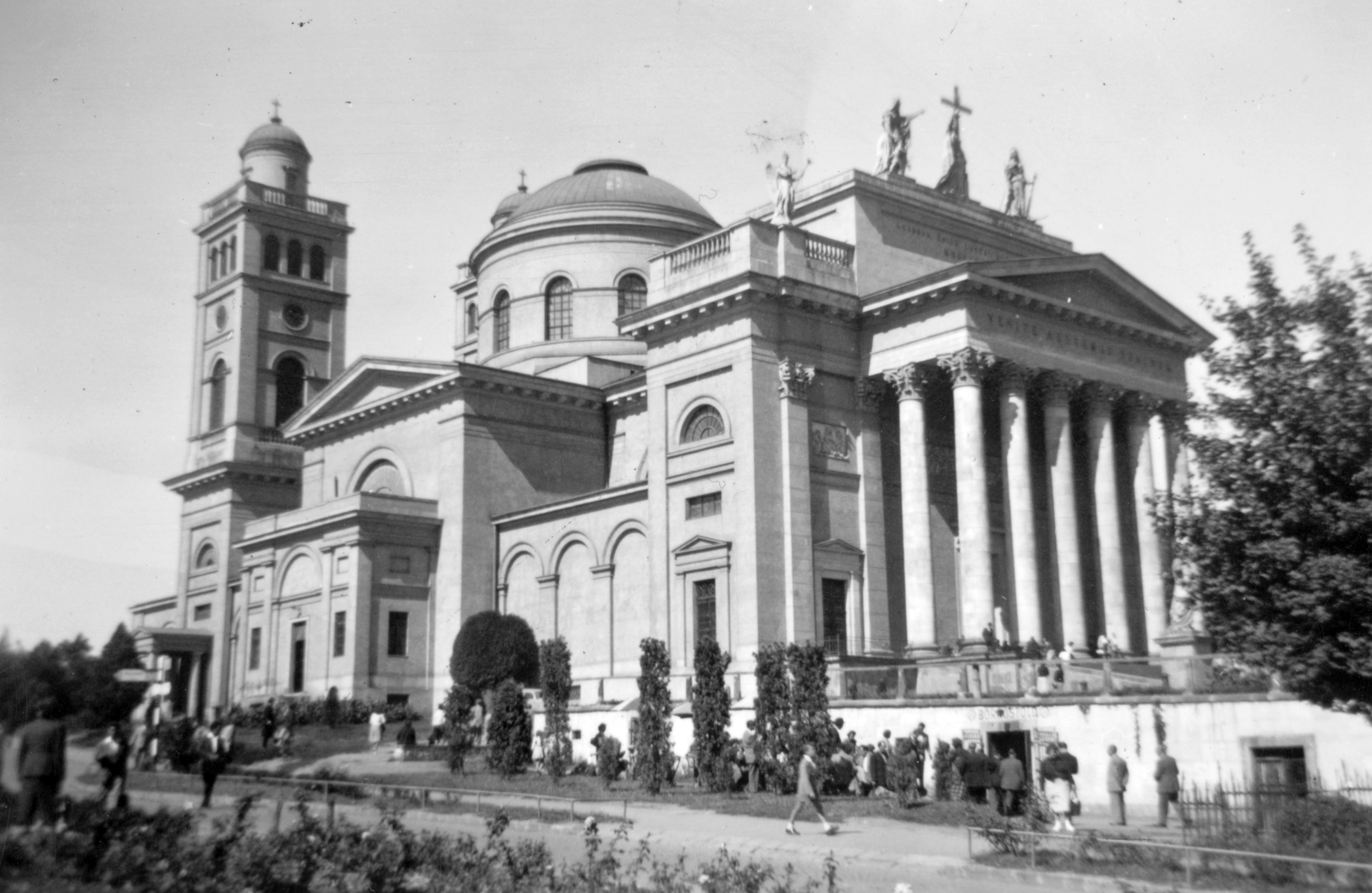
Cathedral Basilica, Eger

Ascension Cathedral in Szatmárnémeti (today Satu Mare, Romania) was built between 1830 and 1837 according to plans by Hild, using parts of the former baroque cathedral. Archbishop Ladislaus Pyrker of Eger commissioned Hild to design the cathedral there; the contract was signed on 28 August 1830, and the basilica, built in 1831–1836, was consecrated in 1837. In 1839, after the death of János Packh, he was placed in charge of the construction of the Primatial Basilica of the Assumption of the Blessed Virgin Mary and St Adalbert in Esztergom. In August 1851 construction began on Saint Stephen's Basilica to Hild's plans, and he led the work until his death.

In 1835 Teleki castle in Gyömrő burnt down. On the base of the former castle Count Sámuel Teleki had the new neo-classicist castle constructed according to the plans of József Hild.

One of his students was Frigyes Feszl.

In 1822, he married Karolina Ritter, and three of their five children lived to adulthood. Despite plenty of work, Hild never amassed a fortune. He designed hundreds of residential buildings and villas, but lived himself in a modest apartment in Lipótváros until the end of his life. His work gradually fell out of fashion. After his wife's death, he lived alone and died almost forgotten

== Works ==
Hild's classicist style contributed greatly to the transformation of Pest in the early 19th century. In his last decades he began to incorporate a broader historicist style, but his best known works are still strongly neoclassicist, particularly the churches.

Eger

- Cathedral Basilica (1831–1836)

Budapest

- Diana Baths (1822)
- Lloyd Palace (1827)
- Nákó House, Roosevelt Square (1833) (subsequently demolished & replaced by the Gresham Palace)
- Saint Stephen's Basilica plans (1848)(completed by Miklos Ybl)
- Apartment buildings e.g. Gross (Jozsef nador squ. 1); Karolyi-Trattner (Petofi Sandor str. 3); Marczibanyi palace (Oktober 6 str.)
- Villas in Hűvösvölgy: Csendilla, Hild-villa
- Remodelling of Kalvin Square & Kalvin Church following the floods in 1838, then also in 1854–55

Esztergom

- Basilica, Savings Bank building, Cathedral Library, Seminary

Cegléd

- Reformed Church
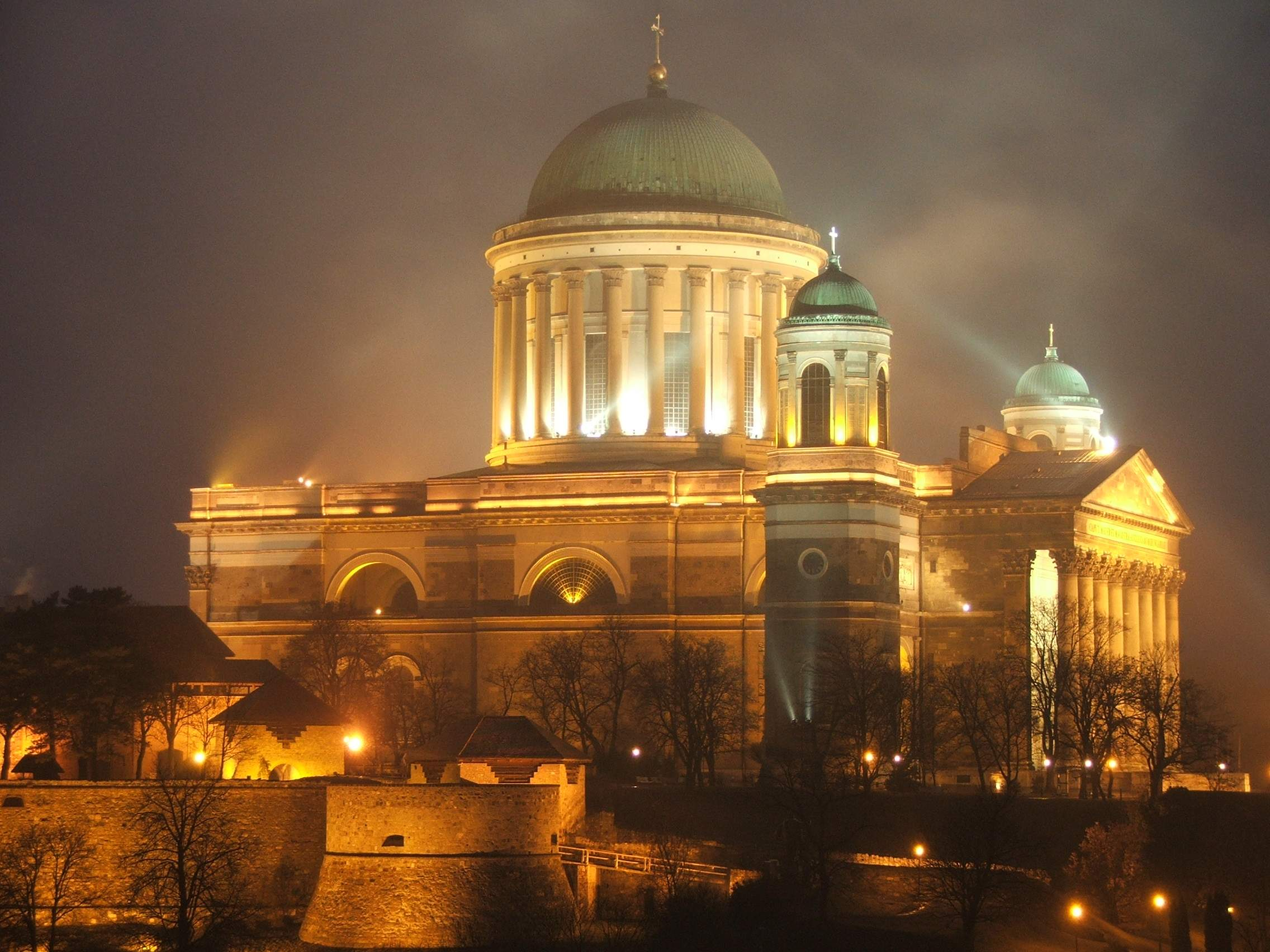
Esztergom Basilica

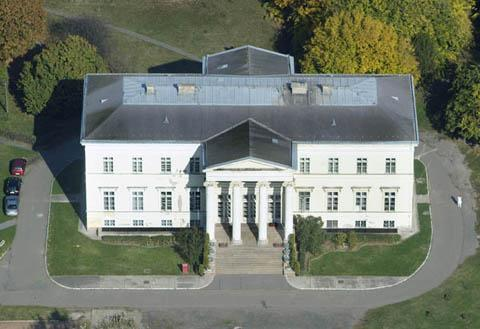
Teleki castle

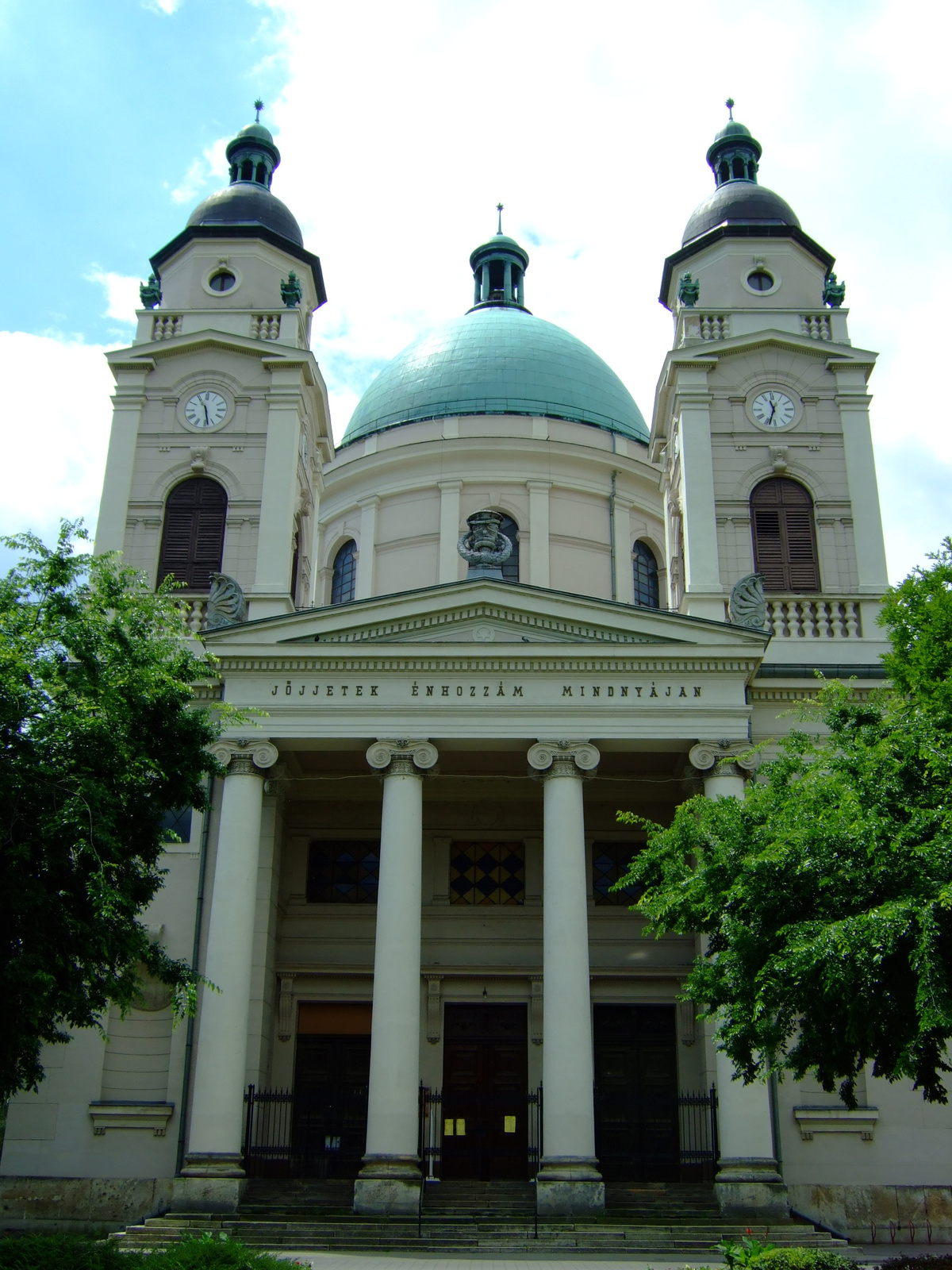
Reformed Church, Cegléd (1835)

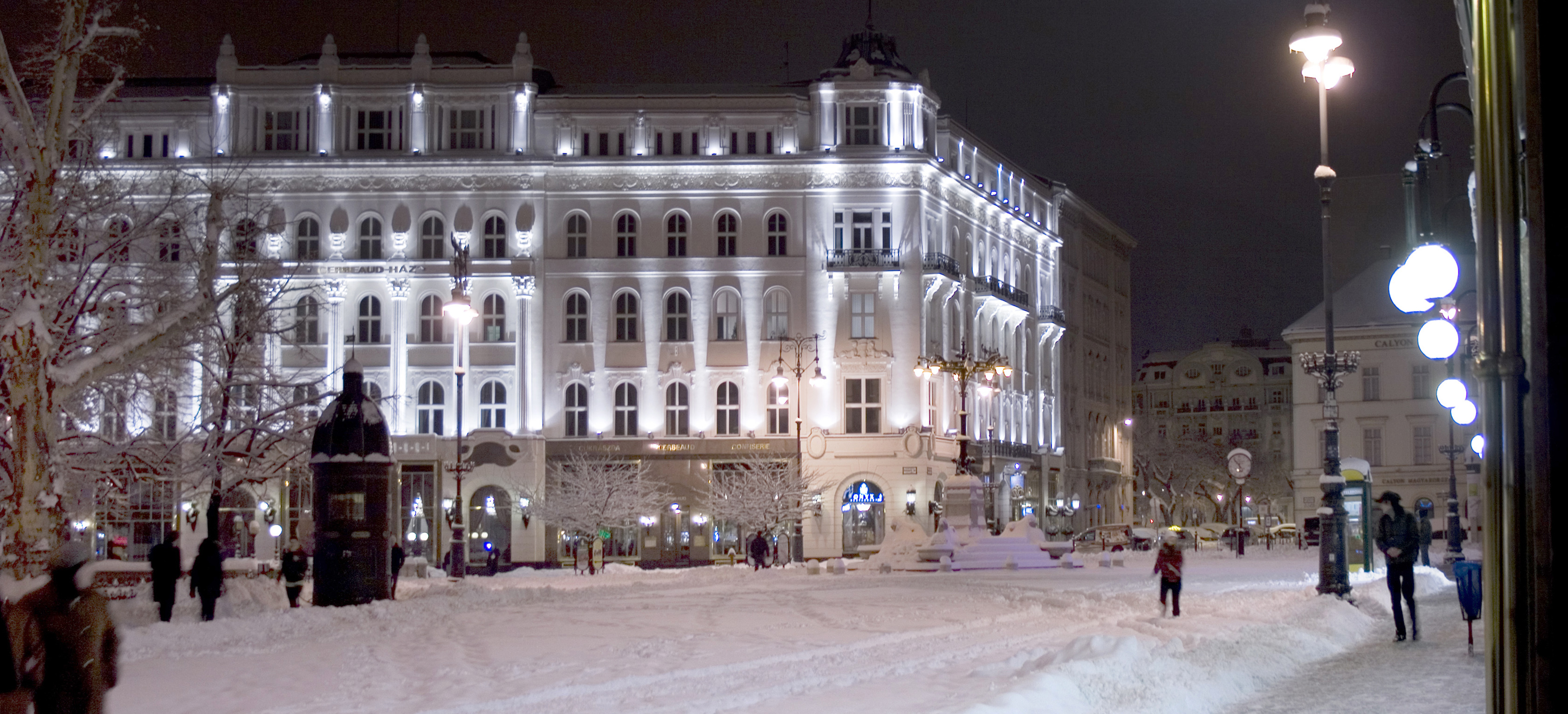
Gerbeaud building (formerly the Pest Trade Bank)

Hild mansion
