= Ascension Cathedral, Satu Mare =

Coordinates: 47.7926°N 22.8765°E

Ascension Cathedral
- Catedrala romano-catolică Înălțarea Domnului
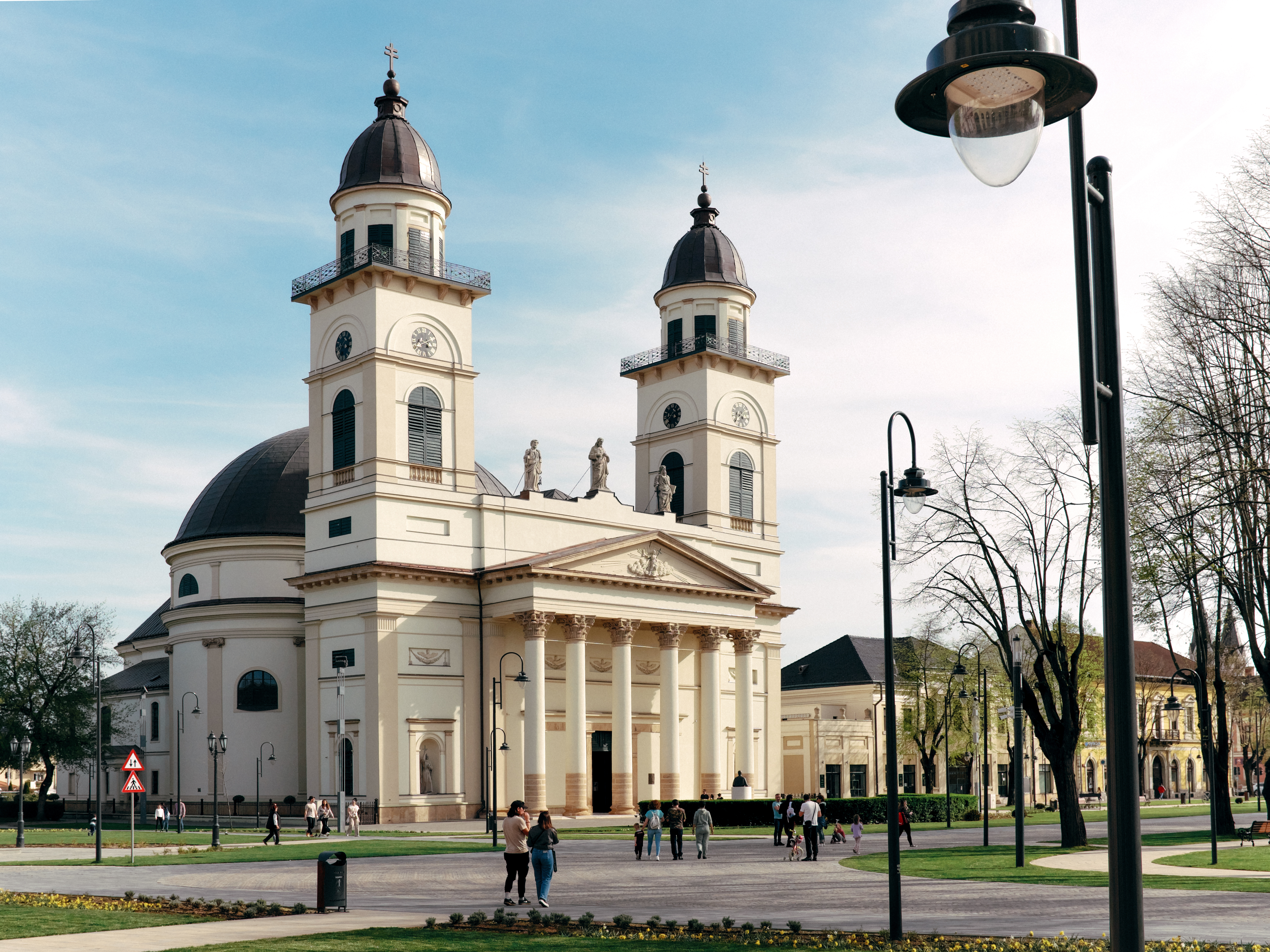
- Ascension Cathedral
- Location: Satu Mare
- Country: Romania
- Denomination: Roman Catholic Church

The Ascension Cathedral (Romanian: Catedrala romano-catolică Înălțarea Domnului; in Hungarian commonly Nagytemplom, Great Church) is the name given to a religious building belonging to the Catholic Church that serves as the cathedral church of the diocese of Satu Mare. It is located in the city of Satu Mare, in the northern part of Romania.

The Satu Mare cathedral was built between 1830 and 1837 according to plans by József Hild, using parts of the former baroque cathedral (built in 1786). External architectural details are mostly neoclassical style, while inside prevail Baroque features.

== See also ==
- Roman Catholicism in Romania
