= Považany =

- Municipality
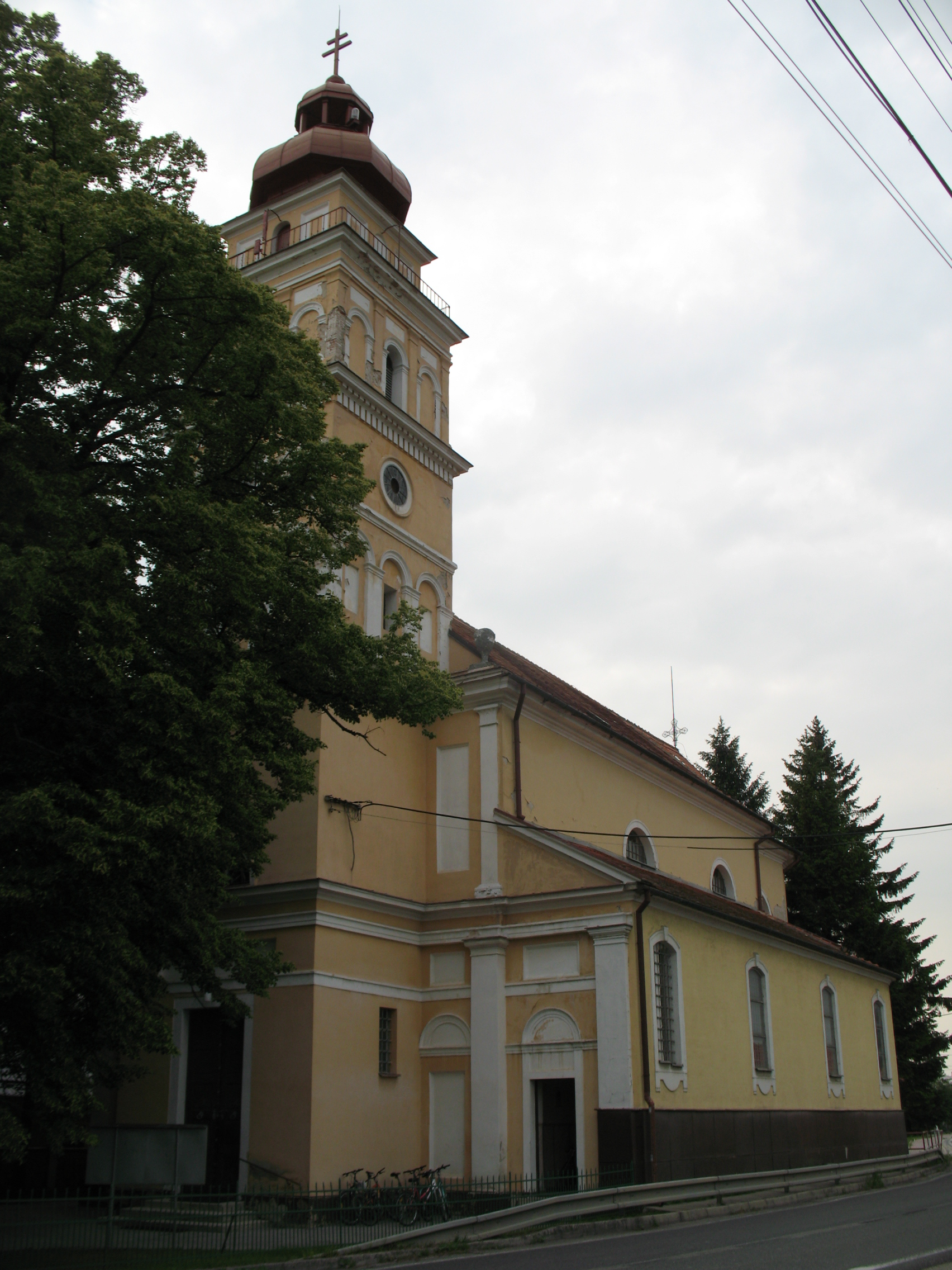
- Church of the Exaltation of the Holy Cross

- Flag

- Location of Považany in the Trenčín Region Location of Považany in Slovakia
- Coordinates: 48.71°N 17.84°E
- Country: Slovakia
- Region: Trenčín Region
- District: Nové Mesto nad Váhom District
- First mentioned: 1263

Area
  - Total: 8.74 km^{2} (3.37 sq mi)
- Elevation: 176 m (577 ft)

Population (2025)
  - Total: 1,218
- Time zone: UTC+1 (CET)
  - Summer (DST): UTC+2 (CEST)
- Postal code: 916 26
- Area code: +421 32
- Vehicle registration plate (until 2022): NM
- Website: www.obec-povazany.sk

Považany (Hungarian: Vágmosóc) is a village and municipality in Nové Mesto nad Váhom District in the Trenčín Region of western Slovakia.

== History ==
In historical records the village was first mentioned in 1263. Before the establishment of independent Czechoslovakia in 1918, Považany was part of Nyitra County within the Kingdom of Hungary. From 1939 to 1945, it was part of the Slovak Republic.

== Geography ==
The municipality lies at an altitude of 176 metres (577 ft) and covers an area of 8.74 km^{2} (3.37 sq mi) (2025).

== Population ==
Population statistic (10 years)
Year	1995	2005	2015	2025
Count	1228	1286	1263	1218
Difference		+4.72%	−1.78%	−3.56%

Population statistic
Year	2024	2025
Count	1226	1218
Difference		−0.65%

It has a population of 1218 people (31 December 2025).

=== Ethnicity ===
Census 2021 (1+ %)
Ethnicity	Number	Fraction
Slovak	1203	97.33%
Not found out	27	2.18%
Total	1236	

In year 2021 was 1236 people by ethnicity 1203 as Slovak, 27 as Not found out, 7 as Czech, 3 as Vietnamese, 2 as Hungarian, 2 as Other, 1 as Italian, 1 as Romani, 1 as Austrian and 1 as Moravian.

Note on population: The difference values of population numbers in the table "Population statistic" and in the sections "Ethnicity" & "Religion" is caused by the use of various statistical methods.

=== Religion ===
Census 2021 (1+ %)
Religion	Number	Fraction
Roman Catholic Church	900	72.82%
None	214	17.31%
Evangelical Church	59	4.77%
Not found out	38	3.07%
Total	1236	

In year 2021 was 1236 people by religion 900 from Roman Catholic Church, 214 from None, 59 from Evangelical Church, 38 from Not found out, 9 from Ad hoc movements, 4 from Seventh-day Adventist Church, 2 from Paganism and natural spirituality, 2 from Other, 2 from Greek Catholic Church, 1 from Jewish community, 1 from Eastern Orthodox Church, 1 from Christian Congregations in Slovakia, 1 from United Methodist Church, 1 from Buddhism and 1 from Apostolic Church.
