= Krušovce =

Krušovce Nyitrakoros
- Municipality
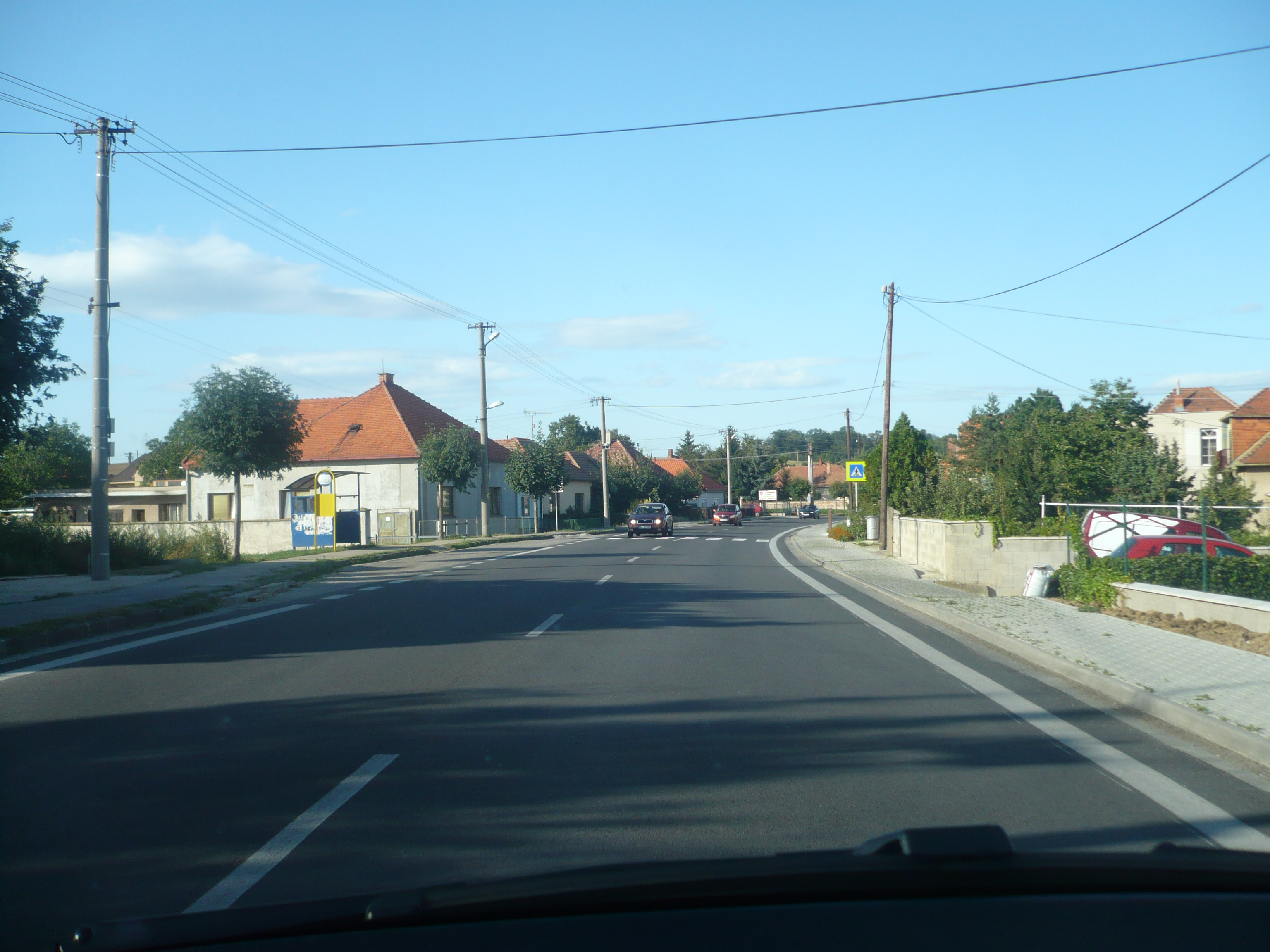

- Flag

- Location of Krušovce in the Nitra Region Location of Krušovce in Slovakia
- Coordinates: 48.59°N 18.21°E
- Country: Slovakia
- Region: Nitra Region
- District: Topoľčany District
- First mentioned: 1158

Government
  - Mayor: Martin Zdychavský (Independent)

Area
  - Total: 13.22 km^{2} (5.10 sq mi)
- Elevation: 176 m (577 ft)

Population (2025)
  - Total: 1,703
- Time zone: UTC+1 (CET)
  - Summer (DST): UTC+2 (CEST)
- Postal code: 956 31
- Area code: +421 38
- Vehicle registration plate (until 2022): TO
- Website: www.krusovce.sk

Krušovce (Hungarian: Nyitrakoros) is a municipality in the Topoľčany District of the Nitra Region, Slovakia. In 2011 it had 1746 inhabitants.

== Geography ==
The municipality lies at an altitude of 176 metres (577 ft) and covers an area of 13.22 km^{2} (5.10 sq mi) (2025).

== Population ==
Population statistic (10 years)
Year	1995	2005	2015	2025
Count	1707	1835	1715	1703
Difference		+7.49%	−6.53%	−0.69%

Population statistic
Year	2024	2025
Count	1724	1703
Difference		−1.21%

It has a population of 1703 people (31 December 2025).

=== Ethnicity ===
Census 2021 (1+ %)
Ethnicity	Number	Fraction
Slovak	1625	93.12%
Not found out	114	6.53%
Total	1745	

In year 2021 was 1745 people by ethnicity 1625 as Slovak, 114 as Not found out, 11 as Romani, 7 as Other, 6 as Romanian, 5 as Czech, 2 as Russian, 2 as Polish, 2 as Hungarian, 1 as Ukrainian, 1 as Serbian, 1 as German and 1 as Moravian.

Note on population: The difference values of population numbers in the table "Population statistic" and in the sections "Ethnicity" & "Religion" is caused by the use of various statistical methods.

=== Religion ===
Census 2021 (1+ %)
Religion	Number	Fraction
Roman Catholic Church	1363	78.11%
None	215	12.32%
Not found out	114	6.53%
Total	1745	

In year 2021 was 1745 people by religion 1363 from Roman Catholic Church, 215 from None, 114 from Not found out, 12 from Evangelical Church, 9 from Greek Catholic Church, 5 from Other, 5 from Seventh-day Adventist Church, 4 from Jehovah's Witnesses, 4 from Christian Congregations in Slovakia, 4 from Ad hoc movements, 2 from Eastern Orthodox Church, 2 from Paganism and natural spirituality, 2 from Apostolic Church, 1 from Calvinist Church, 1 from Islam, 1 from Czechoslovak Hussite Church and 1 from Buddhism.
