= Roman Catholic Diocese of Satu Mare =

Roman Catholic diocese in Romania

Coordinates: 47.7928°N 22.8761°E

Diocese of Satu Mare Dioecesis Satmariensis Dieceza Satu Mare

Catholic
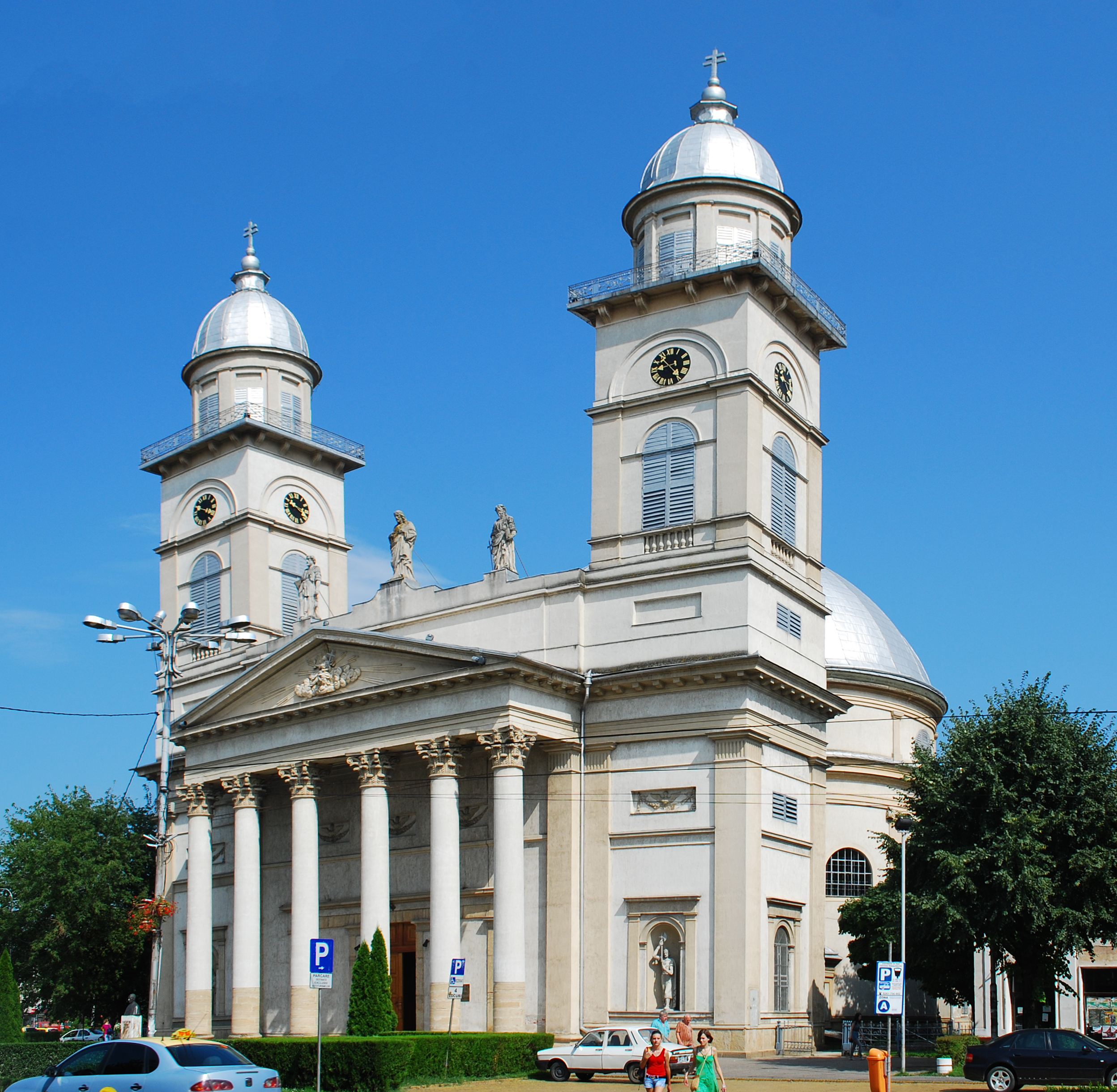
- The Cathedral of the Diocese in Satu Mare

Location
- Country: Romania
- Ecclesiastical province: Bucharest
- Metropolitan: Roman Catholic Archdiocese of Bucharest

Statistics
- Area: 10,725 km^{2} (4,141 sq mi)
- Population: Total; Catholics: (as of 2014); 875,000; 64,137 (7.3%)

Information
- Denomination: Roman Catholic
- Sui iuris church: Latin Church
- Rite: Roman Rite
- Established: 18 October 1982
- Cathedral: Satu Mare Roman Catholic Cathedral

Current leadership
- Pope: Leo XIV
- Bishop: Jenő Schönberger
- Metropolitan Archbishop: Aurel Perca

Map
- Administrative map of the Roman Catholic Church in Romania

Website
- Website of the Diocese

The Diocese of Satu Mare (Latin: Dioecesis Satmariensis; Hungarian: Szatmári Római Katolikus Püspökség) is a Latin diocese of the Catholic Church in Romania. It was established on 23 March 1804 by Francis I, King of Hungary, an act recognised by Pope Pius VII that 9 August. At the time, the diocese was part of the Kingdom of Hungary and covered a larger territory, including land in present-day Hungary and Slovakia as well as Romania. Then it was a suffragan see of the Archdiocese of Eger (until 1930). It was constituted in its present form on 18 October 1982, when the Communist regime split it from the Oradea Mare Diocese.

The diocese has 48 parishes with 90,000 adherents. It covers the counties of Satu Mare and Maramureş, of which 8.2% are Roman Catholic, with concentrations in Satu Mare County along the Hungarian border. Its adherents are predominantly Hungarians, with a small number of Zipser Germans. It is a suffragan diocese to the Bucharest Archdiocese (since 1930). Its bishop since 2003 has been Jenő Schönberger.
