= Țara Oașului =

Region of Romania

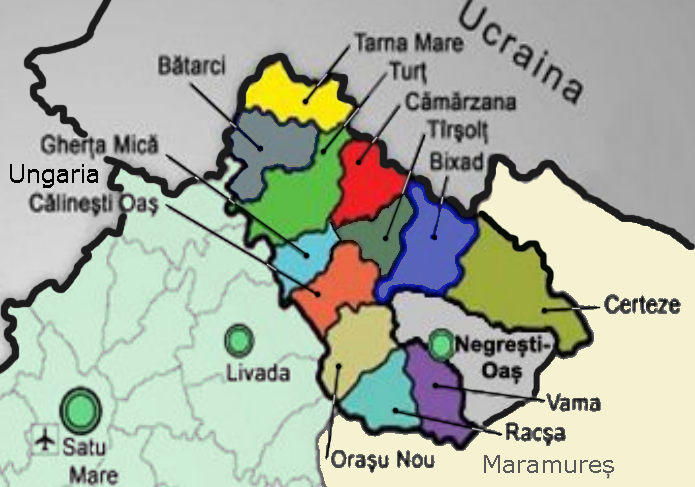
Map of Țara Oașului

Țara Oașului, lit. 'Oaș Country' in Romanian is an ethnocultural and historical region of Romania located in the north-east part of Satu Mare County, 50 km (31 mi) from both Satu Mare and Baia Mare. The total area is about 755.30 km^{2} (291.62 sq mi). The capital of Țara Oașului is the town of Negrești-Oaș.

== Boundaries ==
Țara Oașului extends from Turț – Gherța Mare – Gherța Mică on the western side, all the way to the Huta Pass (situated at an altitude of 604 m (1,982 ft)) in the East, from Cămărzana and Tarna Mare in the North, to the mountains that surround Orașu Nou, Racșa, and Vama in the South. The northern and northwestern side of the region border Ukraine, the eastern and southern side border Maramureș County, while the western side abuts the rest of Satu Mare County.

== Communes ==
Țara Oașului comprises the following communes:

- Bătarci
- Bixad
- Călinești-Oaș
- Cămărzana
- Certeze
- Gherța Mică
- Orașu Nou
- Racșa
- Tarna Mare
- Târșolț
- Turț
- Vama

== Geography ==
The Oaș Mountains are a small volcanic mountain range within the Inner Eastern Carpathians, centered in northern part of Oaș Country; the highest peak is Piatra Vâscului, reaching 917 m (3,009 ft).

The Oaș Depression has maximum altitudes of 400–500 metres (1,300–1,600 ft). Most of the human dwellings are situated alongside the river valleys that cross the Oaș Depression. In the northern part of the depression there are the Talna, Talna Mică, and Valea Muntelui rivers and the Lechincioara Basin, which includes the Lechincioara, Mare, and Semănaturii rivers. In the southern part of Țara Oașului there are the Tur, Valea Rea, and Valea Albă rivers.

== History ==
The first document that mentioned Țara Oașului dates from 1270, when the King of Hungary donated to a nobleman several villages from the southwestern boundary of the "country". In that document, Țara Oașului is mentioned as Terra Awas. Some historians claim that the origin of the word "Oaș" is the "Awas", which means a kind of deforestation or a clearing in the woods.

Țara Oașului was mentioned in the Chronicles of Grigore Ureche.

== Gallery ==
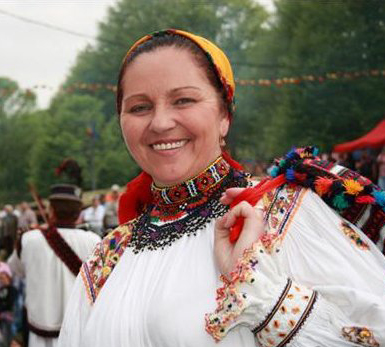
Local folk singer Maria Tripon in traditional costume

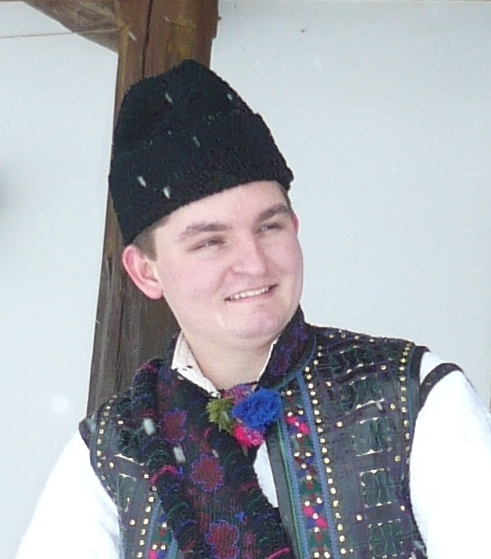
Local folk singer Ionuț Silaghi de Oaș in traditional costume

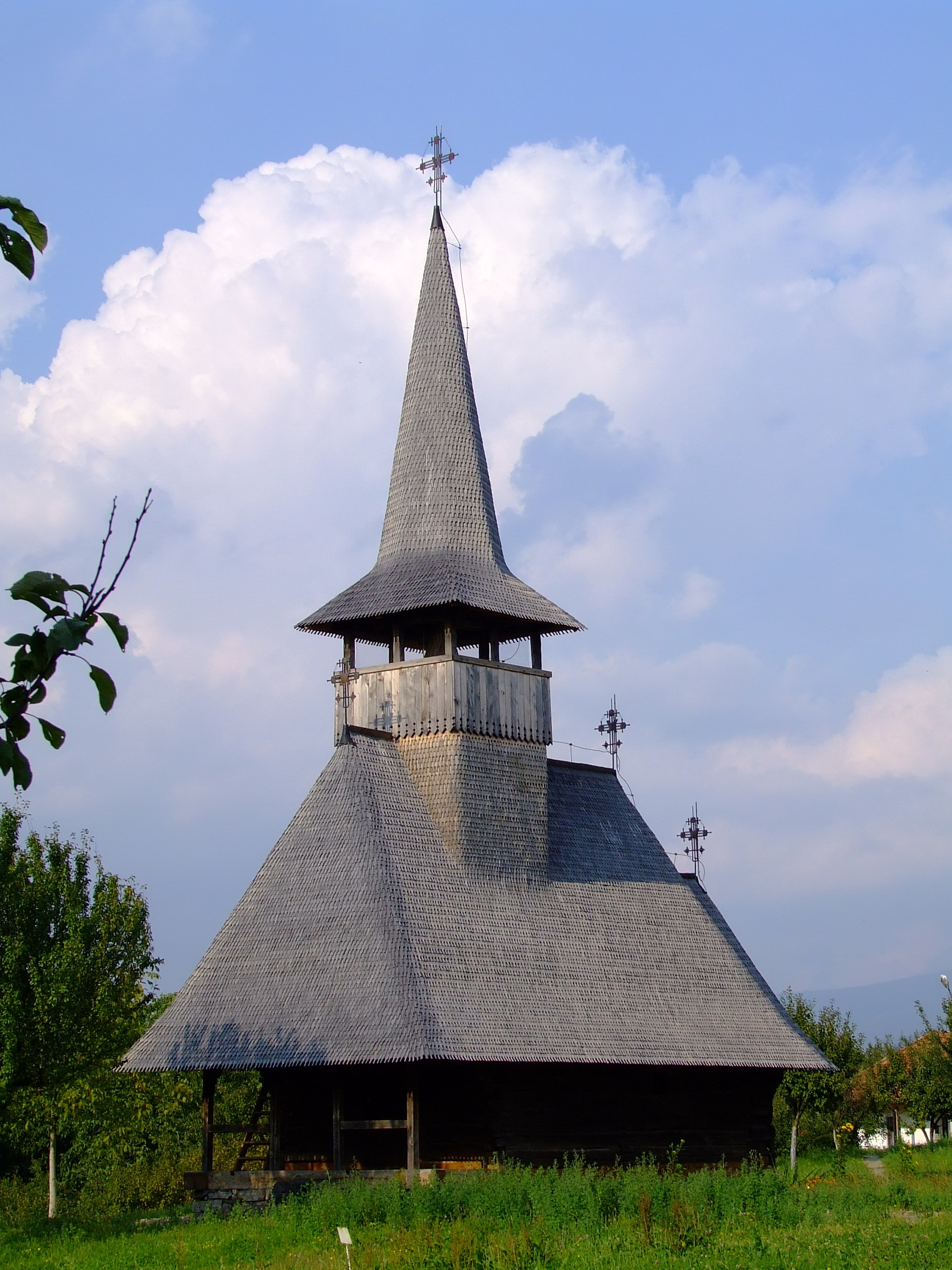
Wooden Church from Lechința, Open Air Museum of Țara Oașului in Negrești-Oaș town, 2008

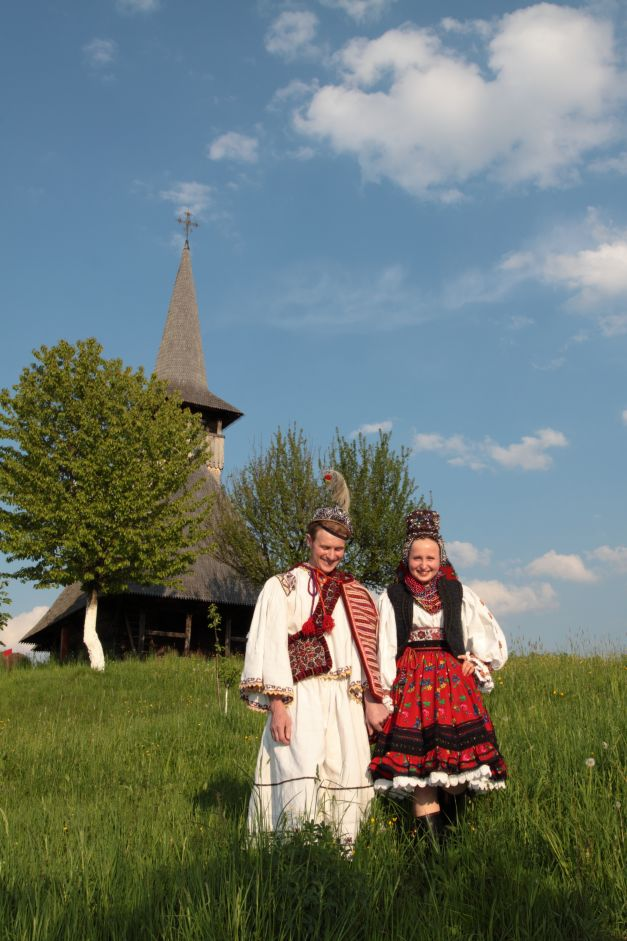
Oaș folk ensemble in the Museum of Țara Oașului

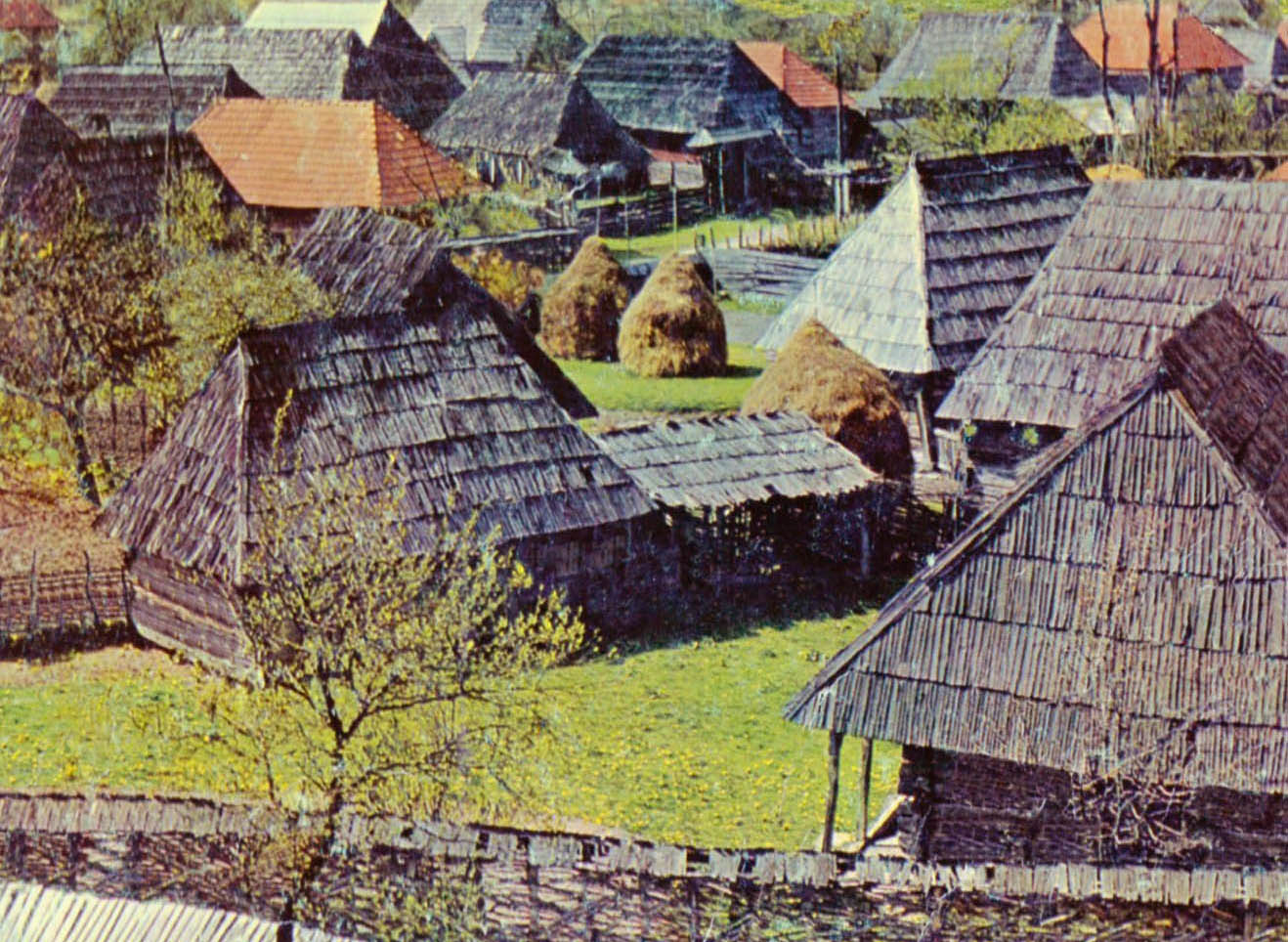
Open Air Museum of Țara Oașului in Negrești-Oaș town

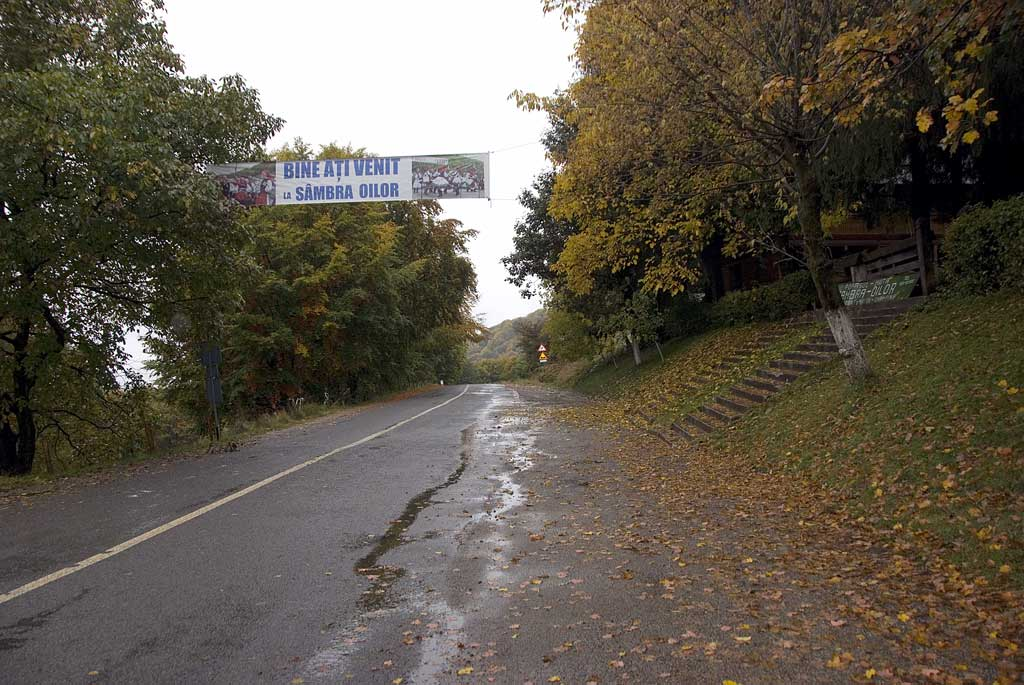
Huta Pass
