= Călinești-Oaș =

- Commune
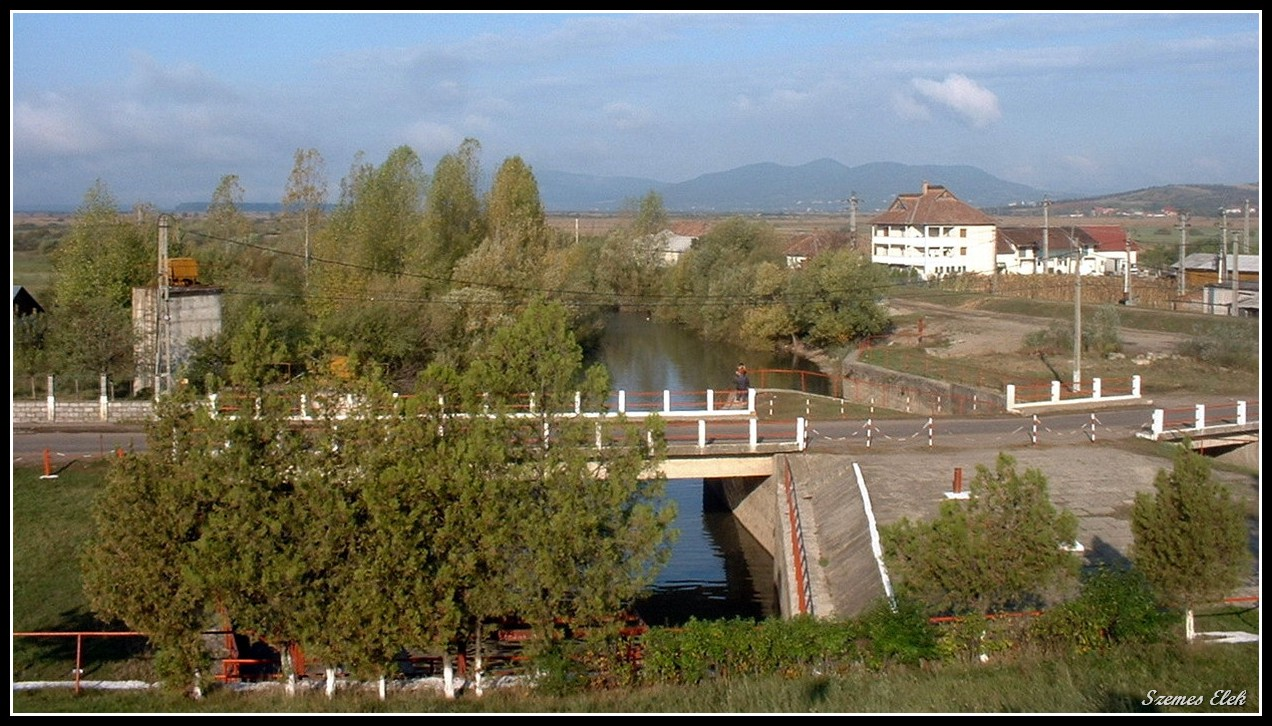

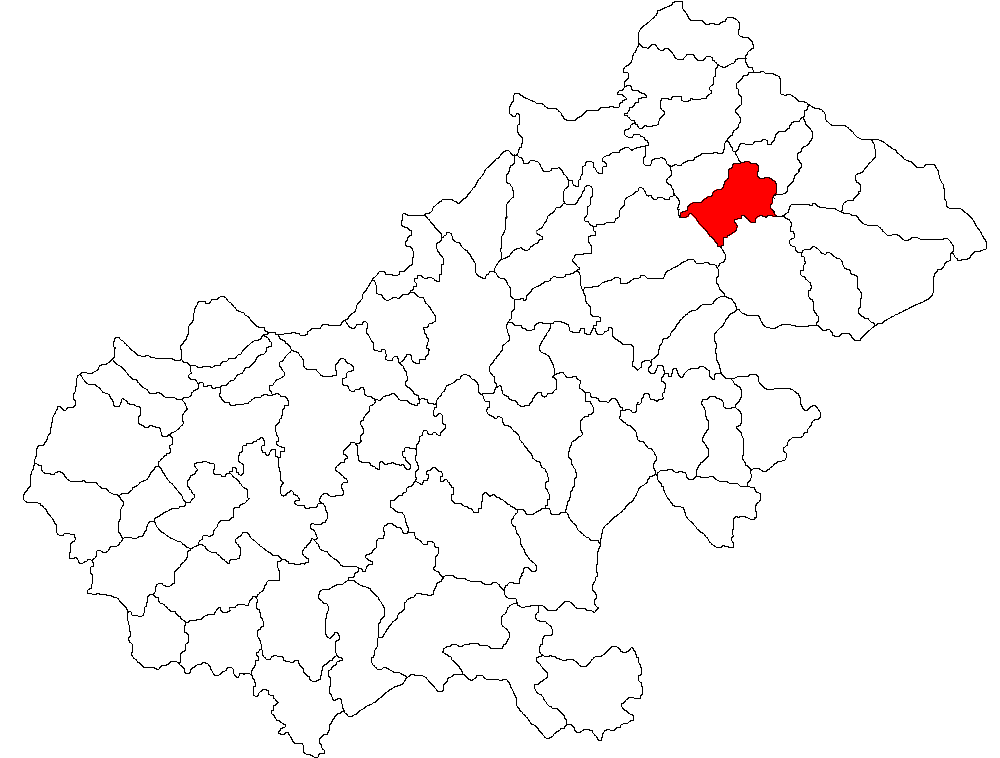
- Location in Satu Mare County

- Location in Romania
- Coordinates: 47°55′13″N 23°17′11″E
- Country: Romania
- County: Satu Mare

Government
  - Mayor (2024–2028): Ioan Bumb (Ind.)
- Area: 41.88 km^{2} (16.17 sq mi)
- Elevation: 200 m (660 ft)
- Population (2021-12-01): 5,117
  - Density: 122.2/km^{2} (316.5/sq mi)
- Time zone: UTC+02:00 (EET)
  - Summer (DST): UTC+03:00 (EEST)
- Postal code: 447070
- Area code: +40 x59
- Vehicle reg.: SM
- Website: www.primariacalinestioas.ro

Călinești-Oaș (Romanian pronunciation: [kəliˌneʃtʲ ˈo̯aʃ]; Hungarian: Kányaháza, Hungarian pronunciation: [kaːniɒhaːzɒ]) is a commune in Satu Mare County, north-western Romania, with a population of 5,117 as of 2021. Part of the region of Maramureș, it is composed of four villages: Călinești-Oaș, Coca (Kakáktelep), Lechința (Avaslekence), and Pășunea Mare (Nagylegelő).

Situated on the western side of the Oaș Country Depression at a distance of 46 kilometres (29 mi) from the county capital Satu Mare, Călinești borders Gherța Mică commune to the north, to the south Prilog-Vii village and Livada city, to the east Boinești village and to the west Turulung commune, which represents the boundary of the Oaș Country.

== Geography ==
Călinești-Oaș is situated in the Oaș Depression, near the Jelejnic Hill, 46 km (29 mi) North - East of the county seat Satu Mare on the Talna and Tur rivers. The commune borders Gherța Mică commune to the north, Prilog Vii village and Livada city to the south, Boinești village to the east and Turulung commune to the west, which represents the boundary between the historical Oaș Country and Ugocea. Călineșticovers an area of 4,188 ha (41.88 km^{2}) of which 828 ha (8.28 km^{2}) comprise the main settlement and 3,360 ha (33.6 km^{2}) are terrain.

Călineşti-Oaş has a continental climate, characterised by hot dry summers and cold winters. As the commune is located in the far north of the country in a mountainous region, the average annual temperature is slightly lower than in Satu Mare.

=== Flora and fauna ===
The flora associated with Călinești-Oaș is characteristic of the low-mountain and hill area with coniferous trees, but other kinds of trees including several oak species and beech are also present.

Fauna is represented by species of rodents (hamster and european ground squirrel), reptiles, carnivorous mammals (bear, gray wolf and fox) and other large mammals like wild boar and deer. Avifauna include species of ducks, geese, egrets and storks during migrations as well as occasional wanderings.

== History ==
The hills surrounding Călinești-Oaș used to be inhabited by communities of hunter-gatherers since the stone Age. Paleolithic discoveries were made on the Hurca Hill, Saint Mary Hill, Lichihorb and Bocoghița. Other important finds indicate that the commune was inhabited during the Neolithic Age and archaeological investigations were made between 1999 and 2001 that established the settlement as dating from the Early Neolithic Age (5500 – 5200 BC). The finds belong to the Starčevo culture representing the northern limit of the culture. On Hurca Hill a big fortified settlement was discovered dating from the 10th and the 9th centuries BC. The fortification consisted of an earthen mound and strengthened with large stone blocks. The fortification dates from the Early Iron Age and belonged to the Gáva culture.

Călinești-Oaș is first mentioned in documents in 1490 as Kalynhaza when the area was incorporated into the domain of Medieșu Aurit, property of the Móric family, a wealthy Hungarian aristocratic family from Győr. Their influence lasted until the 15th century. Other owners of the domains that included Călinești were the Báthory Family of Hungary, Rákóczi, Károlyi (owned during the 18th century) and the Vécsey (owned during the 19th century). After World War I the commune suffered from the 1918 flu pandemic, also known as the Spanish Influenza, which killed 48 people. After the 1970 floods in Romania, which affected large parts of Călinești, the dam on the Tur River was built in 1972; this created a lake of 357 ha (3.57 km^{2}).

== Demographics ==
Historical population
| Year | Pop. | ±% |
|---|---|---|
| 1880 | 2,034 | — |
| 1890 | 2,137 | +5.1% |
| 1900 | 2,339 | +9.5% |
| 1910 | 2,536 | +8.4% |
| 1920 | 2,520 | −0.6% |
| 1930 | 2,781 | +10.4% |
| 1941 | 3,141 | +12.9% |
| 1956 | 3,798 | +20.9% |
| 1966 | 4,329 | +14.0% |
| 1977 | 4,274 | −1.3% |
| 1992 | 4,748 | +11.1% |
| 2002 | 4,701 | −1.0% |
| 2011 | 4,686 | −0.3% |
| 2021 | 5,117 | +9.2% |
Source: Census data

At the 2011 census, the population of Călinești-Oaș commune was 4,686. Of these inhabitants, 99% were Romanians, 0.6% Roma, and 0.4% belonged to other groups; 85.6% were Romanian Orthodox, 6.7% Greek-Catholic, 6.4% Pentecostal, and 1.3% other or undeclared. At the 2011 census, the population had increased to 5,117; of those, 96.66% were Romanians and for 3.15% the ethnicity was unknown.

== The dam ==
The Călinești-Oaș Dam was built in 1972 on the river Tur near the confluence with the Valea Rea between the Hurca and Jelejnic Hills. It creates an artificial lake of 357 ha (3.57 km^{2}) and with a total volume of 0.027 km^{3} (0.0065 mi^{3}). In the same year the Călineşti-Oaş Micro - Hydropower Station was built having a low capacity Pelton turbine of only 0.8 MW.
