= Rodion Markovits =

Austro-Hungarian-born writer, journalist and lawyer

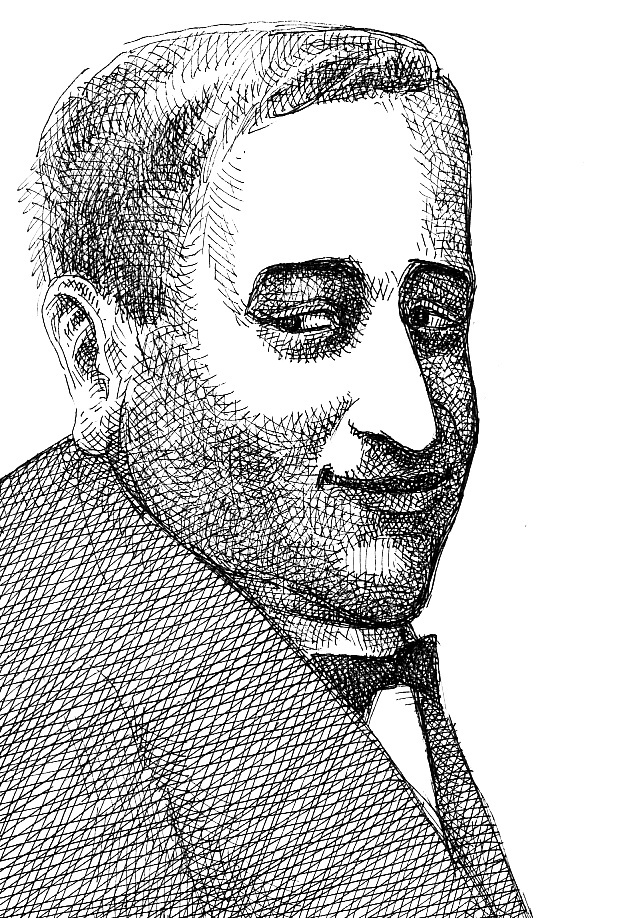
- Posthumous portrait of Markovits, drawing by Sándor Muhi
- Born: Markovits Jakab; 1888; Kisgérce, Austria-Hungary (today Gherța Mică, Romania)
- Died: August 27, 1948 (aged 60); Timișoara, Romanian People's Republic
- Occupations: journalist, novelist, short story writer, activist, lawyer
- Writing career
- Period: 1920–1956
- Genres: memoir, non-fiction novel, reportage
- Movements: Modernism, Ma, Erdélyi Helikon

Rodion Markovits (Hungarian pronunciation: [ˈrodion ˈmɒrkovit͡ʃ]; or Markovitz, born Markovits Jakab [ˈjɒkɒb]; 1888 – August 27, 1948) was an Austro-Hungarian-born writer, journalist and lawyer, one of the early modernist contributors to Magyar literary culture in Transylvania and Banat regions. He achieved international fame with the extended reportage Szibériai garnizon ("Siberian Garrison", 1927–8), which chronicles his own exotic experiences in World War I and the Russian Civil War. Locally, he is also known for his lifelong contribution to the political and cultural press of Transylvania. A Romanian national after 1920, Markovits divided himself between the Hungarian Romanian and Jewish communities, and was marginally affiliated with both the Ma art group and the Erdélyi Helikon writers.

Rodion Markovitz was seen by his contemporaries as an eccentric, and some of his colleagues believed him a minor and incidental writer. He was also noted for his leftist inclinations, cemented during his personal encounter with Bolshevism but toned down during the final decades of his life. Although he continued to publish short stories until the 1940s, and wrote the sequel novel Aranyvonat ("Gold Train"), his work never again matched the success of Szibériai garnizon. His final home was the Banat city of Timișoara, where he worked for the Romanian and Hungarian press, and eventually became a grassroots activist of the Hungarian People's Union.

== Biography ==
=== Early life and World War I ===
Culturally and ethnically, Markovits was of Hungarian-Jewish extraction, and socially belonged to the lower classes. His background may have been Jewish assimilationist, and he regarded himself as ethnically Hungarian, but his interest in maintaining links with secular Jewish culture put distance between him and the more committed assimilationists. Historian Attila Gidó nevertheless includes Markovits among the most prominent Jews who helped promote, from within, the Hungarian urban culture of Transylvania.

The writer's home village was Kisgérce (today Gherța Mică, Romania), in the ethnographic region of Avasság (Țara Oașului). He spent part of his childhood in Szatmárnémeti (today Satu Mare, Romania), the local urban center, where he attended Catholic school and then the Kölcsey Calvinist College. Young Markovits went on to study Law at the Faculty of Law of the Budapest (Eötvös Loránd) University, but mainly focused on his budding career as writer and cultural journalist, publishing with left-leaning or satirical periodicals such as Fidibusz, Népszava, Független, Ifjú Erők, Korbács, Szatmár és Vidéke and Márton Lovászy's Magyarország. Upon graduation, he also worked as a lawyer.

Romanian literary historian Cornel Ungureanu refers to World War I as Markovits' "first great journalistic adventure". Markovits was mobilized into the Austro-Hungarian Army a few months into the conflict. In early 1915, he was sent with the 12th Royal Hungarian Army infantry regiment to the Eastern Front, and was captured by the Russian military during summer 1916. His account places this event at the peak of Russia's Brusilov Offensive. Also according to Markovits, the column of Hungarian captives (including much of the 12th) was ordered to the transit camp of Darnytsia (Kiev), then his contingent was carried by train to Kineshma and by boat to Makaryevo. Their rest was interrupted by news that they were to be moved into Siberia, and eventually they were relocated to the banks of the Ussuri River, on Russia's nominal border with the Republic of China.

=== Revolutionary politics ===
Markovits spent the next seven years of his life in Siberia and the Russian Far East—first as a prisoner of war, then as a drifter. He was notably held in Krasnaya Rechka prison camp, where he founded a newspaper for Hungarian captives, Szibériai Újság. Here, the Austro-Hungarian captives were reached by news of the February Revolution, and began organizing themselves into political or national factions even before the October Revolution sparked chaos in their captors' ranks. Nominally free, the prisoners were left to fend for themselves: after the Russian Civil War began, they purchased a train and, with it, made as far west as Samara, passing by Bolshevik units and Czechoslovak Legions, and being then pushed back into Siberia by the war tide; some Hungarians left the convoy to join the Bolsheviks' Red Guards.

Markovits was held in an isolated and improvised camp near Krasnoyarsk, where life conditions became brutal and the rank structure collapsed entirely. From this location, the entire group of Austro-Hungarians witnessed first hand the mutiny of Russian soldiers from the 30th Regiment, its repression by the White Army, followed by the mass murder of all disarmed rebels and the selective killing of Hungarians who supposedly helped them. According to Markovits, the camp population took its revenge by firing on the retreating Whites of Aleksandr Kolchak, capturing some 8,000 men—an action which had the unwanted effect of bringing typhus into the camp.

Markovits survived the outbreak and joined the newly created Red Army, where he became political commissar at a brigade level. According to his own fictionalized account, he volunteered to help with the coal transports organized by the Red squadrons, and was rewarded with repatriation (through the Baltic states, East Prussia and then Poland).

By the time Markovits returned to Transylvania, the entire region had been united with Romania. He decided to settle in Satu Mare, where he opened a law practice and continued work for the local Hungarian press—as editor of Szamos daily and correspondent for Cluj's Keleti Újság. He made his return to literature with short stories, grouped as Ismét találkoztam Balthazárral ("Once More, I Ran into Balthazar") and published in 1925.

The former prisoner had remained a committed follower of Leninism, as described by Ungureanu: "Taking his place on the left's barricades, living intensely the utopian illusions of communism, Markovits was to illustrate, in the early 1920s (like Malraux, Wells, Shaw, Panait Istrati, Gide etc.), the frenzy of enrollment." In the early to mid-1920s, Rodion Markovits came into contact with the socialist art magazine Ma, published in Vienna by Lajos Kassák and other leftist writers who opposed the regimes of Regency Hungary. Also left-leaning, the Romanian monthly Contimporanul paid homage to Ma as the regional ally of its own avant-garde program: "The reddish air of revolution has braided together the youth of Ma artists and the ideology of a revolution that might have realized their ideal. And the world awaited for the new Christ. But once the White reaction took over, Ma exiled itself to Vienna [...] A new period, a new foundation, a new language emerge with the adoption of collective Constructivism." Between the Constructivist cells of Ma and Contimporanul, and ensuring that the Hungarian and Romanian avant-gardes remained in contact, there was a cosmopolitan group of Transylvanian leftists: Markovits, Aurel Buteanu, Károly Endre, Robert Reiter, and Julius Podlipny.

=== Literary prominence ===
Szibériai garnizon was originally serialized by Keleti Újság during 1927. The next year, it was reissued as two volumes. These caught the eye of fellow writer Lajos Hatvany, who undertook their translation into German, for Vossischen Zeitung and later for Ullstein-Verlag. The 1929 English version by George Halasz was published in the United States by Horace Liveright, and the first print was exhausted over a few months. A French translation was published by Éditions Payot in 1930.

The books were translated into some 12 other languages before 1933, reaching as far as Asia and South America and making Markovits an international celebrity of the interwar period. According to cultural historian Ivan Sanders, Markovits was, "for a time, the best-known Transylvanian writer in the world." As commentators have since noted, Szibériai garnizon also announced to the world that Hungarian literature in Transylvania was coming of age, even though its subject and content were largely dissonant with the aims of Transylvania's existing literary clubs.

In the larger context of Hungarian literature as divided by the interwar borders, Markovits has drawn parallels with the war-themed literature of Géza Gyóni, Aladár Kuncz, Máté Zalka, and Lajos Zilahy. According to Ungureanu, solid links exist between Markovits and an entire category of Austro-Hungarian intellectuals who turned into revolutionaries. Ungureanu concludes: "Settled in the 'once upon a time' provinces of the Empire or wandering the world in search of a 'juster' cause, [these authors] give name to a finality — a shipwreck."

Following the international confirmation, Markovits attracted interest among Transylvanian and Romanian writers of all cultures. The Bucharest daily Dimineața featured the serialized Romanian-language version shortly after its German edition saw print. Meanwhile, the Transylvanian Hungarian editors of Erdélyi Helikon review asked Markovits to join their literary club and, in 1929, he visited them at Marosvécs-Brâncovenești. Helikon contributor Ernő Ligeti left a memoir of the meeting, in which Markovits comes across as the uncommunicative eccentric. The puzzled and (according to Sanders) envious Ligeti noted that Markovits did not live up to the respect of his "penniless" fans, did not show any interest in Helikon's educational agenda, and only "opened his mouth" to impart "droll anecdotes".

=== In Timișoara ===
After February 1931, Markovits moved to the Banat's cultural center, Timișoara, having been granted an editor's position at Temesvári Hírlap (the Hungarian and liberal daily of László Pogány). This relocation, Ungureanu notes, was the end of his communist engagements, and his reinvention as "a reasonable newspaperman". Markovits' writing was later featured in the Romanian-language magazine Vrerea, put out by the left-wing poet Ion Stoia-Udrea. Their common agenda, also shared by Timișoaran intellectuals Virgil Birou, Zoltán Franyó, Andrei A. Lillin, and József Méliusz, defined itself around notions of multiculturalism and class conflict. In a 1935 interview, he declared his "spontaneous, sincere and complete affiliation" to the proposals for greater cooperation between Hungarian and Romanian authors.

These years saw the publication of Markovits' two new books: the novels Aranyvonat and Sánta farsang ("Limp Carnival"), and the short prose collection Reb Ancsli és más avasi zsidókról szóló széphistóriák ("Stories About Reb Anschl and Other Jews from the Mountains"). According to Ivan Sanders, "Markovits's subsequent novels were not nearly as successful as Siberian Garrison." Ligeti, who recalled that Markovits fared badly in his journalistic career, mentions that Reb Ancsli... required its author to peddle his way back to the publishers' attention.

Markovits survived World War II from his new home in the Banat, while Regency Hungary incorporated his Northern Transylvanian place of birth. By 1944, Romania had control over both regions, and a transition to communism was first envisaged. At the time, Markovits became a volunteer activist of the Hungarian People's Union, a regional and ethnic partner of the Romanian Communist Party. He resumed his journalistic activity, writing for various Magyar papers in Romania and the Republic of Hungary (Képes Újság, Szabad Szó, Utunk, Világ), gave public readings of his newer works, and lectured at the Béla Bartók Summer University. For a while, Markovits was also president of the Association of Banat Hungarian Writers.

Rodion Markovits died unexpectedly, in his sleep, on August 27, 1948, and was buried at the Timișoara Jewish Cemetery.

== Literary work ==
Ismét találkoztam Balthazárral was in fact Markovits' earliest account of his Siberian trek. Writing in 1930 for the Transylvanian periodical Societatea de Mâine, literary critic Ion Chinezu argued that the volume was merely negligent: "The mannerism of these Siberian memoirs, written with coffee house negligence, was not a good recommendation." By contrast, Szibériai garnizon survives as Markovits' one great book. Chinezu even ranks it better than the period's other war novels (All Quiet on the Western Front), since, beyond "fashion and psychosis", it "has remarkable qualities". An editorial review in the US Field Artillery Branch Coast Artillery Journal also noted: "Siberian Garrison, by sheer force of merit, has become the literary sensation of Europe".

Overall, reviewers agree that the volume is hard to classify in the grid of established genres. Although often read as a novel (a "documentary novel", Sanders suggests), Szibériai garnizon carries the subtitle of "collective reportage". It is a second-person narrative focused on a Budapest lawyer, very likely Markovits' alter ego, who interprets things around him through the grid of objectivity, common sense, and boredom. Coast Artillery Journal described Markovits' "unforgettable" creation as "in a class of its own": equal parts novel, diary, historical account, and "war book".

Szibériai garnizon, Chinezu notes, lacks all the formal qualities of a novel and veers into "clicking monotony", but, "for all its longueurs, is lively and propels itself into the reader's awareness." Similarly, La Quinzaine Critique columnist André Pierre reported: "The work is located outside the frame of literature, and constitutes a seething document of life, rich in hallucinatory visions." Reviewer Al. Simion writes that the book has as its fortes the "concreteness of images", a "gentle or not so gentle" irony, and, overall, "a limpidness reminding one about the clarity of deepest wells"; the book's universe, he argues, is "flat perhaps, but transparent". Coast Artillery Journal found the narrative to be "distinctly Slavic", "introspective, analytical, sometimes morbid, with a fatalistic acceptance of the inevitable".

To the background of historical events, Szibériai garnizon explores existential themes. According to Chinezu, the text is important for showing the alienation of a prisoner, the man's transformation into "anonymous digit", and the apathetic crowd into which he submerges. Characters fall into two main categories: those who conveniently forget their countries of birth for the duration of their ordeal, and those who miss them so much that they risk escaping and making the perilous journey across Asia. The one sustained effort against apathy is mounted by a militaristic and loyalist group of prisoners, who establish a Siberian branch of Turul Society. Markovits retells the dramatic failure of their honor system, and the ridiculousness of their cultural endeavors, with subdued irony (over what Chinezu calls his "many acid pages"). Al. Simion also notes that, in their Siberian exile, the prisoners come to understand the fragility of their own Empire.

Beyond commentary on the "burlesque bankruptcy of militarism", the reportage is a humorous critique of capitalism. Chinezu reads this in Markovits' depiction of officers, including aged ones, who quickly retrain and build themselves lucrative careers as shoemakers or shopkeepers. The Romanian critic concludes: "the eternal opposition of exploiters and exploited takes its form here, in the heart of Asia." The spark of revolution achieves the destruction of social convention, but also replaces monotony with the presentment of doom. "At one with the events," Simion writes, "the individual or collective dramas and tragedies unfold in accelerated rhythms, in an often demented cavalcade. The extraordinary, the apocalyptic are metamorphosed into diurnal experience." According to Pierre, Markovits' literary effort is on par with the published diaries of another Siberian captive, Edwin Erich Dwinger. Dwinger and the Hungarian author depict "the same destitution, the same sexual perversions, a disruption of ideas and convictions after the Russian Revolution, the camp's transformation into a workers' phalanstère."

With Reb Ancsli és más avasi zsidókról szóló széphistóriák, Markovits alienated his Hungarian Romanian public, a fact noted by Ivan Sanders. "This curious collection", Sanders writes, "is indeed much closer in spirit and style to popular Yiddish literature than to Transylvanian Hungarian writing, and [Ernő] Ligeti notes this, too, with a mixture of amusement and disdain."

== Legacy ==
In Communist Romania, Markovits' overall work was considered for translation and republication during the mid-1960s—a project of the state-run ESPLA Publishing House, with assistance from his former Timișoaran colleagues Zoltán Franyó and József Méliusz. Markovits continued to be respected by the national communist authorities, even as the diplomatic contacts with Hungary began to worsen. Around 1968, the Romanian regime promoted Markovits, Jenő Dsida, Sándor Makkai, Aladár Kuncz and some others as the canonical authors of Hungarian-Romanian literature, but, Hungarian observers wrote, it remained silent about the more unpalatable political stances these authors took. In a 1981 review of Hungarian Romanian literature, published by the Romanian Communist Party's Era Socialistă, Kuncz and Markovits were introduced as authors of "anti-militarist novels [...] unmasking the cruelty of World War I".

A Romanian edition of Szibériai garnizon was eventually re-translated by Dan Culcer, and published with Bucharest's Editura Kriterion. After being researched and collected by writer János Szekernyés, Markovits' articles were grouped in the 1978 volume Páholyból ("From the Booth").

Markovits' work continued to be revered even after the Romanian Revolution of 1989 toppled communism. Editura Dacia republished Garnizoana din Siberia, and his work was included in a commemorative anthology of writers from Satu Mare County. The writer's home in Gherța Mică is preserved as the Rodion Markovits Memorial House.
