= Orașu Nou mine =

Bentonite mine in Satu Mare County, Romania

- Location: Orașu Nou, Satu Mare County, Romania
- Products: Bentonite
- Production: 14,700 tonnes of bentonite
- Financial year: 2008
- Opened: 1955
- Company: Bentonita S.A.

The Orașu Nou mine is a large, privately-held mine in the northwest of Romania in Satu Mare County, 45 kilometres (28 mi) northeast of Satu Mare and 641 kilometres (398 mi) north of the capital, Bucharest. Orașu Nou represents the largest bentonite reserve in Romania, having estimated reserves of 25 million tonnes (25,000,000 long tons; 28,000,000 short tons).
