= Acâș =

Acâș Ákos
- Commune
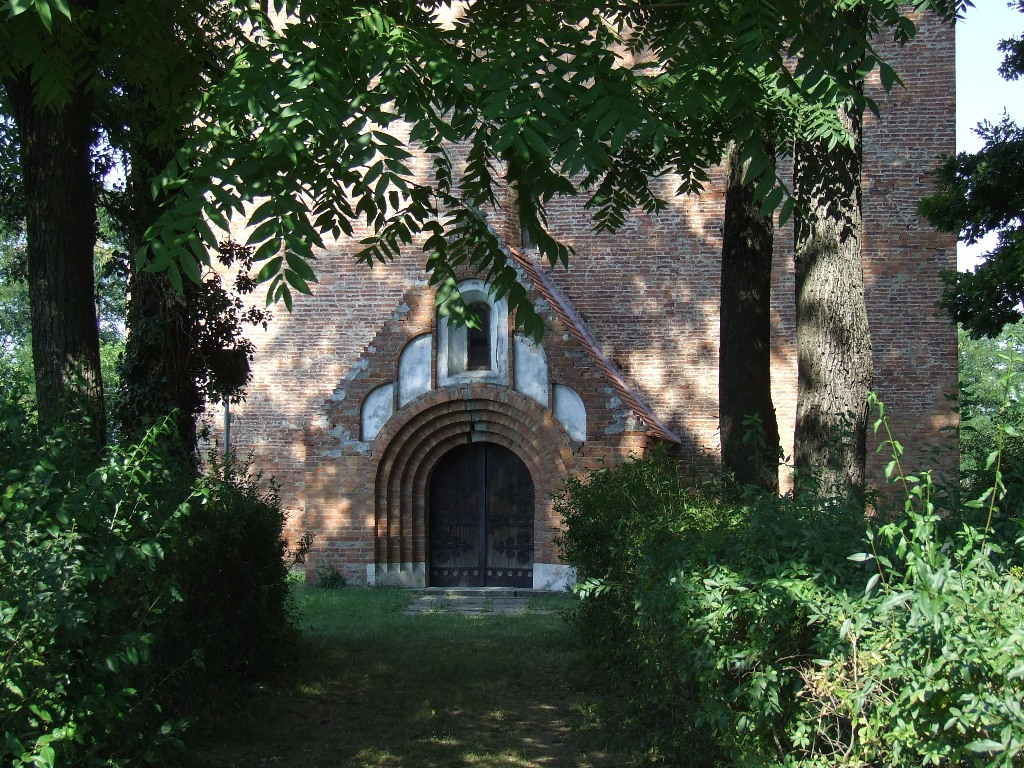
- Reformed church in Acâș

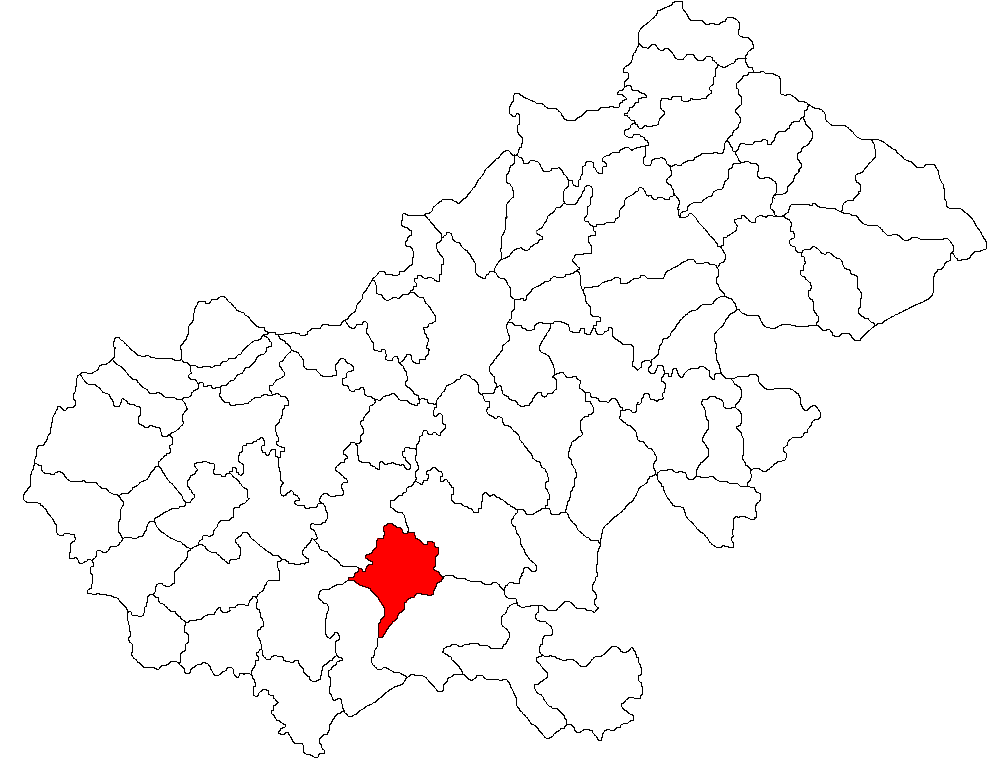
- Location in Satu Mare County

- Location in Romania
- Coordinates: 47°32′N 22°47′E
- Country: Romania
- County: Satu Mare

Government
  - Mayor (2020–2024): Tibor Balogh (PNL)
- Area: 63.78 km^{2} (24.63 sq mi)
- Elevation: 136 m (446 ft)
- Population (2021-12-01): 2,728
  - Density: 42.77/km^{2} (110.8/sq mi)
- Time zone: UTC+02:00 (EET)
  - Summer (DST): UTC+03:00 (EEST)
- Postal code: 447005
- Area code: +(40) x59
- Vehicle reg.: SM
- Website: www.primariaacas.ro

Acâș (Hungarian: Ákos, Hungarian pronunciation: [ˈaːkoʃ]; German: Fürstendorf) is a commune of 2,728 inhabitants situated in Satu Mare County, Crișana, Romania. It is composed of four villages: Acâș, Ganaș (Gánás), Mihăieni (Krasznamihályfalva), and Unimăt (Újnémet, Neudorf).

The commune is located in the southern part of the county, 38 km (24 mi) from the county seat, Satu Mare. The river Crasna flows through Acâș village and the river Ier flows through Mihăieni village.

Acâș is crossed by national road DN19A (part of European route E81), which starts in Supur, 8.8 km (5.5 mi) to the south, goes through Satu Mare, and ends in Dorolț, at the Hungary–Romania border crossing.

== Demographics ==
Historical population
Year	Pop.	±%
1850	5,026	—
1880	4,650	−7.5%
1890	4,945	+6.3%
1900	5,503	+11.3%
1910	5,833	+6.0%
1920	5,268	−9.7%
1930	5,784	+9.8%
1941	6,295	+8.8%
1956	6,256	−0.6%
1966	5,760	−7.9%
1977	5,230	−9.2%
1992	4,705	−10.0%
2002	2,859	−39.2%
2011	2,827	−1.1%
2021	2,728	−3.5%
Source:Census Database

At the 2002 census, Acâș had 2,859 inhabitants; of those, 55.7% were Hungarians, 22% Romanians, 22% Roma, and 0.3% Germans. According to mother tongue, 77.5% of the population spoke Hungarian, while 22.3% spoke Romanian as their first language.

At the 2011 census, the commune had a population of 2,827, of which 43.23% were Hungarians, 26.85% Roma, and 26.81% Romanians. At the 2021 census, the population had decreased to 2,728; of those, 40.65% were Roma, 32.18% Hungarians, and 21.66% Romanians.

== Sister cities ==
- Markaz, Hungary
