= Turț =

- Commune
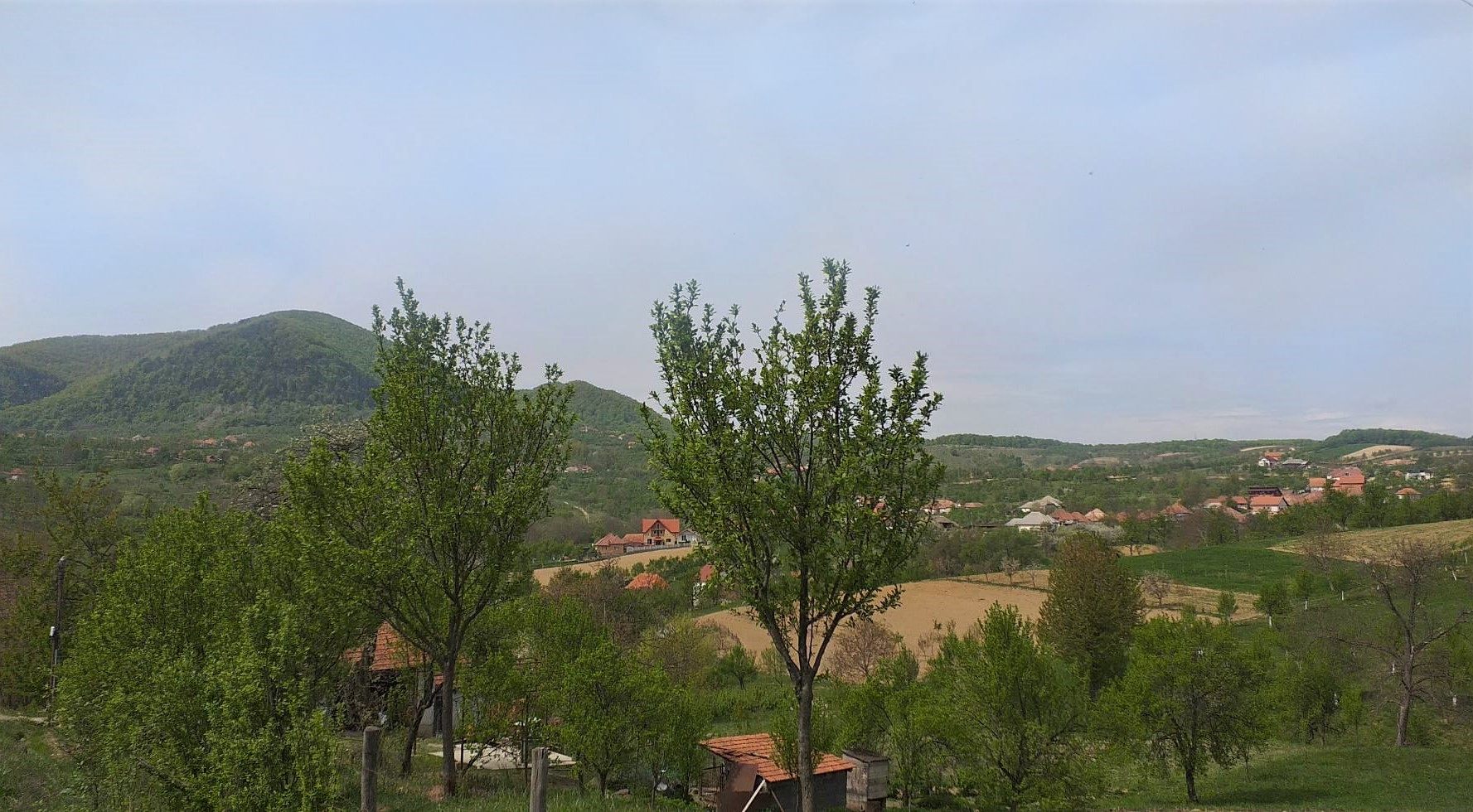
- View of Turț-Băi

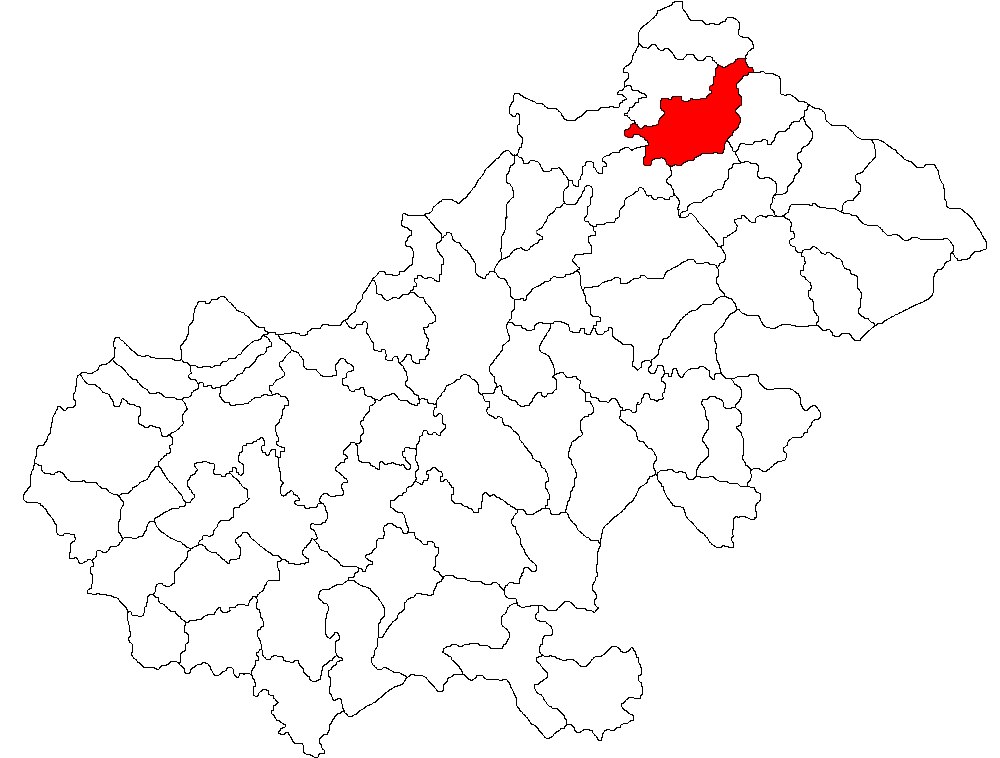
- Location in Satu Mare County

- Location in Romania
- Coordinates: 47°59′N 23°13′E
- Country: Romania
- County: Satu Mare

Government
  - Mayor (2020–2024): Ioan Irime (PNL)
- Area: 82.22 km^{2} (31.75 sq mi)
- Highest elevation: 680 m (2,230 ft)
- Lowest elevation: 630 m (2,070 ft)
- Population (2021-12-01): 7,936
  - Density: 96.52/km^{2} (250.0/sq mi)
- Time zone: UTC+02:00 (EET)
  - Summer (DST): UTC+03:00 (EEST)
- Postal code: 447330
- Vehicle reg.: SM
- Website: www.primariaturt.ro

Turț (Hungarian: Turc, pronounced [ˈturts]) is a commune of 6,579 inhabitants situated in Satu Mare County, Romania. It is composed of three villages: Gherța Mare (Nagygérce), Turț and Turț-Băi (Turcfürdő).

The commune is located in the northeastern part of the county, at a distance of 44 km (27 mi) from the county seat, Satu Mare. It lies on the banks of the Turț River and it is bordered on the north by Tarna Mare commune, on the northeast and east by Ukraine and Cămărzana commune, on the south by Gherța Mică and Turulung communes, on the southwest by Halmeu commune, and on the northwest by Bătarci commune.
