= Electrica Transylvania North =

Former Romanian electricity distribution company

Electrica North Transylvania (Romanian: Societatea de Distribuție a Energiei Electrice Transilvania Nord S.A.) was a Romanian electricity distribution company headquartered in Cluj-Napoca. It distributed and supplied electric power to over 1 million customers across six counties in north-western Romania: Cluj, Bihor, Maramureș, Satu Mare, Sălaj, and Bistrița-Năsăud.

On 1 January 2021, Electrica North Transylvania merged with Electrica's other two distribution subsidiaries, Transilvania Sud and Muntenia Nord to form a single national distribution operator, Distribuție Energie Electrică România S.A. (DEER).

== Operations ==
Prior to its consolidation into DEER, Electrica North Transylvania operated across an area of 34,160 km^{2}. It managed approximately 39,996 km of overhead and underground power lines, 90 transformer stations, and 7,535 transformation units.

In 2002, the company sold over 3,845,622 MWh of electricity, making it one of the largest regional distribution branches in Romania at the time.

== Distribution ==
Installation	MU	Cluj	Oradea	Baia Mare	Bistrița	Satu Mare	Zalau	Electrica North Transylvania
LV Overhead Lines / Underground Lines	km	5.750	5.375	4.023	2.386	2.302	2.548	22.384
MV Overhead Lines / Underground Lines	km	3.437	3.873	2.106	1.322	1.907	1.831	14.476
110 kV Overhead Lines / Underground Lines	km	909	953	523	395	202	154	3.136
110 kV Transformer Substations	buc	24	24	18	9	9	6	90
MV/LV Transformer Substations	buc	1.808	2.457	1.113	643	777	737	7.535
