= Egri =

Egri can refer to following:

- Agriș (Hungarian: Egri), a commune in Romania
- Lajos Egri (1888-1967), a literary analyst and teacher
