= Aliceni =

Aliceni may refer to several villages in Romania:

- Aliceni, a village in Poșta Câlnău Commune, Buzău County
- Aliceni, a village in Târșolț Commune, Satu Mare County
