= Botiz =

- Commune
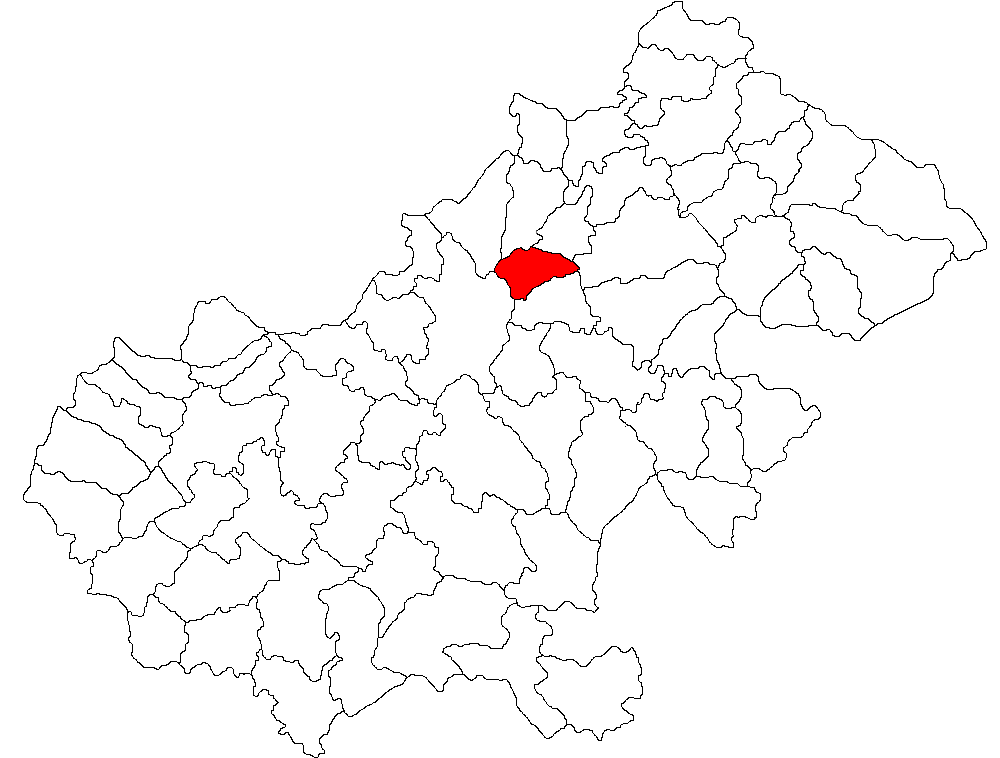
- Location in Satu Mare County

- Location in Romania
- Coordinates: 47°50′N 22°57′E
- Country: Romania
- County: Satu Mare

Government
  - Mayor (2020–2024): Ioan Mureșan (PNL)
- Area: 36.34 km^{2} (14.03 sq mi)
- Elevation: 125 m (410 ft)
- Population (2021-12-01): 3,604
  - Density: 99/km^{2} (260/sq mi)
- Time zone: EET/EEST (UTC+2/+3)
- Postal code: 447065
- Area code: +(40) 261
- Vehicle reg.: SM
- Website: botiz.ro

Botiz (Hungarian: Batiz; Hungarian pronunciation: [ˈbɒtiz]) is a commune situated in Satu Mare County, Romania. It is composed of a single village, Botiz. Until 2004, it also included Agriș and Ciuperceni villages, but these were split off that year to form Agriș Commune.

East of Botiz, there is a medium-wave broadcasting station with two 139-metre-tall guyed masts.

== Demographics ==
At the 2011 census, the commune had 3,622 inhabitants; of those, 71.4% were Romanians, 22.5% Hungarians, and 4.7% Roma. At the 2021 census, Botiz had a population of 3,604, of which 75.8% were Romanians, 13.6% Hungarians, and 3.36% Roma.
