= Oaș Mountains =

Mountain range in eastern Europe

Coordinates: 47°59′22″N 23°24′40″E

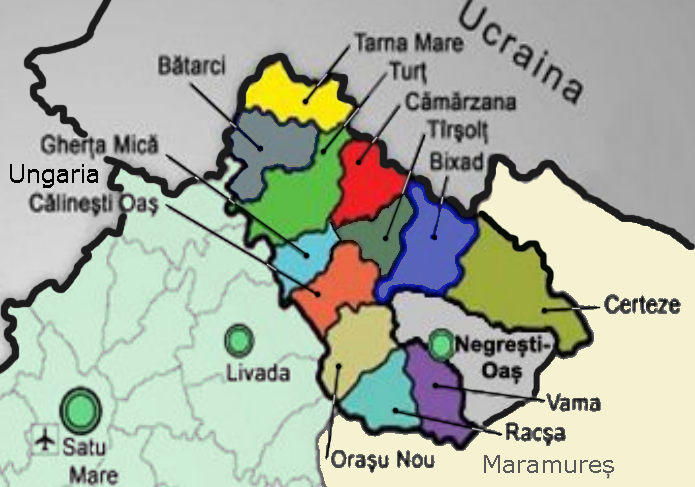
Oaș Country in Romania

The Oaș Mountains (Romanian: Munții Oașului; Hungarian: Avas-hegység; Ukrainian: Гори Оаш) are a small volcanic mountain range within the Vihorlat-Gutin Area of the Inner Eastern Carpathians. The mountains are centered in the northern section of the Țara Oașului, covering the border area between the Satu Mare County in Romania, and the Zakarpattia Oblast in Ukraine. They are an extension of the Gutin Mountains.

The highest peak is Piatra Vâscului, reaching 917 m (3,009 ft).

The Huta Pass (elevation 587 m (1,926 ft)), a mountain pass in the Oaș Mountains, connects the counties of Maramureș and Satu Mare.

== See also ==
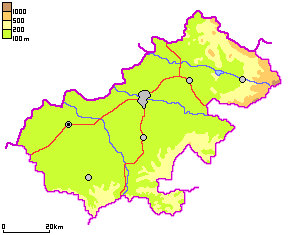
Satu Mare County in Romania, with Oaș Mountains and Gutin Mountains located on the northern and eastern borders

- Țara Oașului
- Romanian Carpathians
- Ukrainian Carpathians

== Sources ==
- Földvary, Gábor Z. (1988). Geology of the Carpathian Region. Singapore: World Scientific Publishing Company. ISBN 9789813103825.
