= Huta Pass =

- Romanian: Pasul Huta
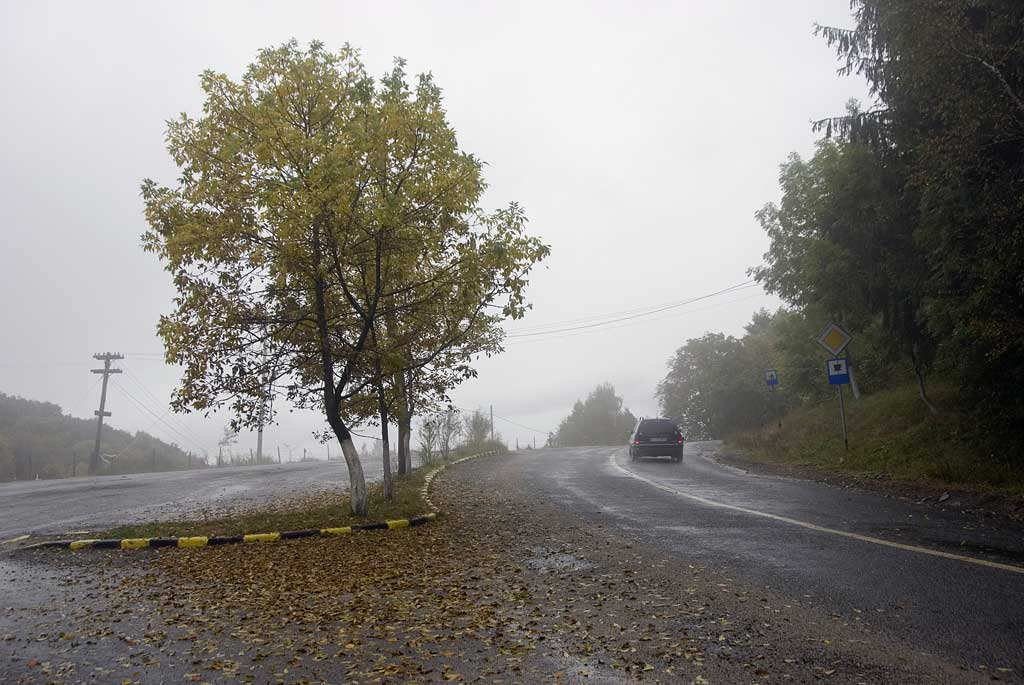

- Location within Romania
- Elevation: 587 metres (1,926 ft)
- Traversed by: DN19

Third Approach
- Location: Romania
- Range: Oaș Mountains
- Coordinates: 47°57′33″N 23°30′17″E

Huta Pass (elevation 587 m (1,926 ft)) is a pass in the Oaș Mountains of the Inner Eastern Carpathians in northern Romania. The pass connects the counties of Maramureș and Satu Mare.

The Huta Pass is traversed by national road DN19, which starts in Sighetu Marmației, 41 km (25 mi) to the east, continues over the pass, and then descends to Negrești-Oaș, 14.5 km (9 mi) to the southwest.

Every May, the Sâmbra Oilor Festival (which marks the start of transhumance for the local sheep herds) is held near the Huta Pass.
