= Vama, Satu Mare =

Vama Vámfalu
- Commune
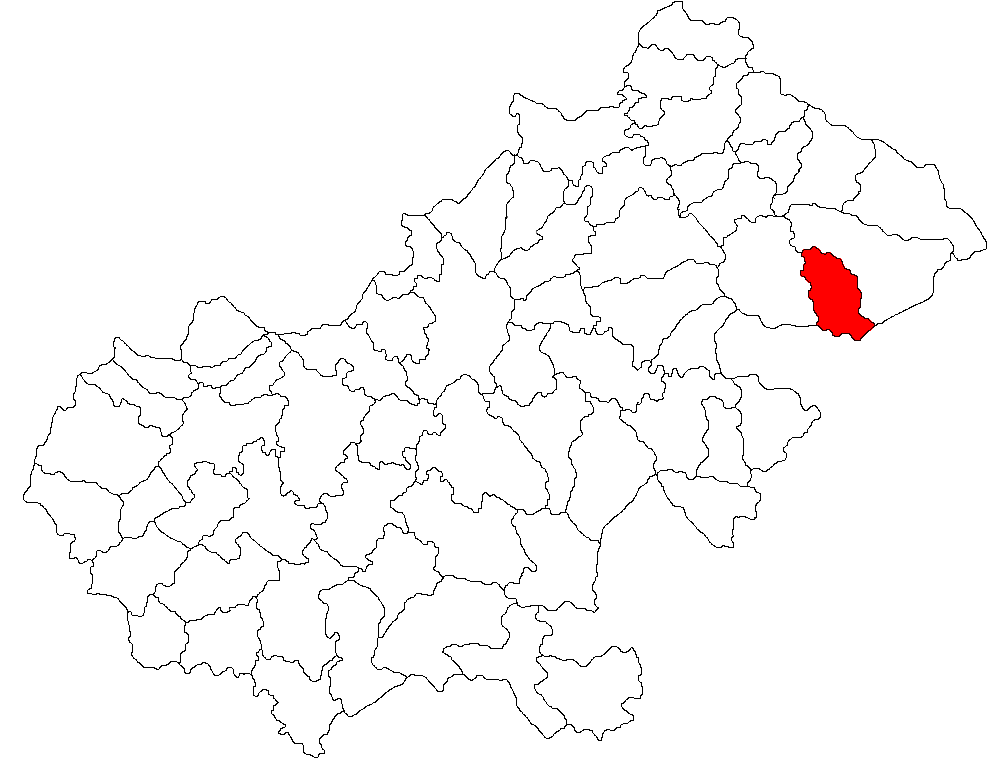
- Location in Satu Mare County

- Location in Romania
- Coordinates: 47.8419°N 23.3975°E
- Country: Romania
- County: Satu Mare

Government
  - Mayor (2020–2024): Vasile Corodan (PNL)
- Area: 51.04 km^{2} (19.71 sq mi)
- Elevation: 195 m (640 ft)
- Population (2021-12-01): 3,670
  - Density: 72/km^{2} (190/sq mi)
- Time zone: EET/EEST (UTC+2/+3)
- Postal code: 447350
- Area code: +40 261
- Vehicle reg.: SM
- Website: vama-sm.ro

Vama (Hungarian: Vámfalu, pronounced: [vaːmfɒlu]) is a rural municipality of 3,670 inhabitants situated in Satu Mare County, in the historical region of Transylvania, Romania. It is composed of a single village, Vama.

== Geography ==
The commune is located in the Țara Oașului ethnographic and historical region in the northeastern part of Satu Mare County, on the border with Maramureș County. It lies at an altitude of 195 m (640 ft), on the banks of the river Talna Mică. Vama is situated 46 km (29 mi) northeast of the county seat, Satu Mare; it is crossed by national road DN19, which starts in Oradea, goes through Satu Mare, and ends in Sighetu Marmației.

== Vama Pottery ==
Vama commune maintains a tradition of pottery work. The local tradition is very old; the documents from the commune's archives confirm pottery workshops being in existence since the beginning of the 19th century.

== Demographics ==
At the 2002 census, the commune had a population of 3,670, of which 70% were Romanians, 27% Hungarians, and 2% Roma. At the 2011 census, there were 3,486 inhabitants, of which 68.7% Romanians and 26.56% Hungarians. At the 2021 census, Vama had a population of 3,670 inhabitants, of which 68.94% were Romanians, 21.06% Hungarians, and 1.66% Roma.

Historical population
Year	Pop.	±%
2002	3,670	—
2011	3,486	−5.0%
2021	3,670	+5.3%
Source: INS, Census data
