= Vetiș =

Vetiș Vetés
- Commune
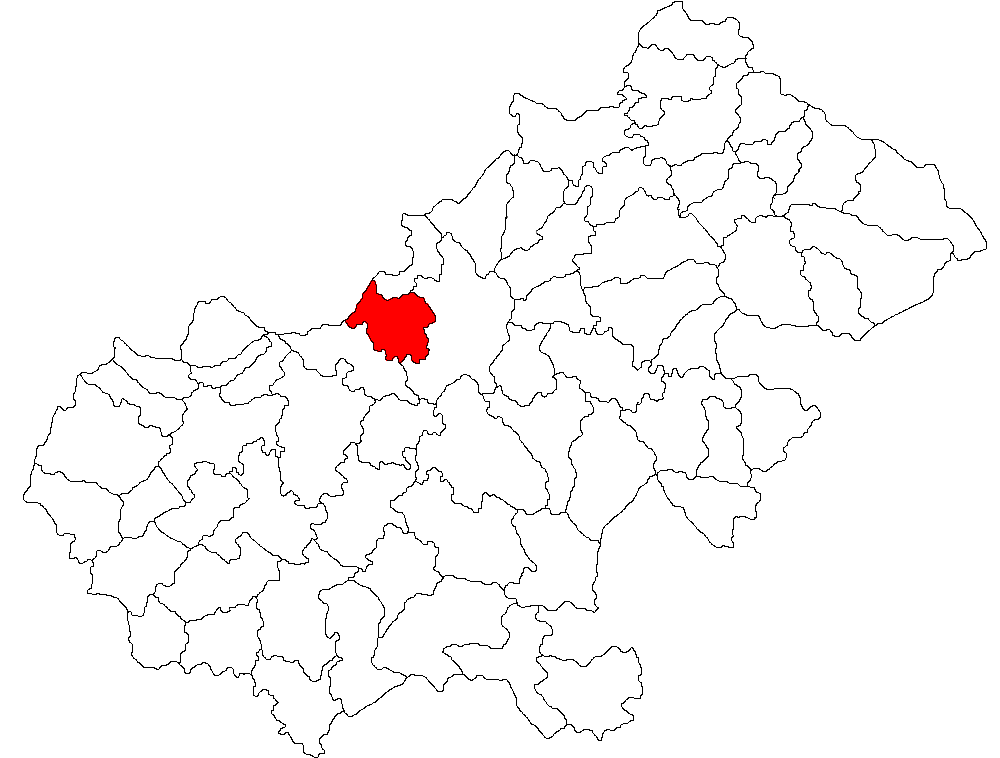
- Location in Satu Mare County

- Location in Romania
- Coordinates: 47°48′N 22°46′E
- Country: Romania
- County: Satu Mare

Government
  - Mayor (2024–2028): Ionel-Daniel Codrea (PSD)
- Area: 46.35 km^{2} (17.90 sq mi)
- Elevation: 121 m (397 ft)
- Population (2021-12-01): 5,384
  - Density: 120/km^{2} (300/sq mi)
- Time zone: EET/EEST (UTC+2/+3)
- Postal code: 447355
- Area code: +(40) 261
- Vehicle reg.: SM
- Website: vetis.ro

Vetiș (Hungarian: Vetés, Hungarian pronunciation: [ˈvɛteːʃ]) is a commune of 4,475 inhabitants situated in Satu Mare County, Romania. It is composed of three villages: Decebal (Újtelep), Oar (Óvári), and Vetiș.

The commune is located in the western part of the county, 9 km (5.6 mi) from the county seat, Satu Mare, on the border with Hungary.

== Demographics ==
Historical population
Year	Pop.	±%
1880	2,616	—
1890	2,933	+12.1%
1900	3,285	+12.0%
1910	3,259	−0.8%
1920	2,904	−10.9%
1930	3,528	+21.5%
1941	3,763	+6.7%
1956	4,294	+14.1%
1966	4,348	+1.3%
1977	4,742	+9.1%
1992	4,537	−4.3%
2002	4,475	−1.4%
2011	4,788	+7.0%
2021	5,384	+12.4%
Source: Census data

At the 2002 census, the commune had a population of 4,475; of those, 48.78% were Romanians, 45.87% Hungarians, 2.59% Roma, and 2.57% Ukrainians. According to mother tongue, 59.10% of the population spoke Hungarian, while 39.55% spoke Romanian as their first language. At the 2011 census, the number of inhabitants had increased to 4,788, of which 47.58% were Romanians, 40.89% Hungarians, 5.45% Roma, and 1.46% Ukrainians. At the 2021 census, Vetiș had a population of 5,384; of those, 55.2% were Romanians, 30.44% Hungarians, 3.7% Roma, and 1.52% Ukrainians.
