= Săcășeni =

Săcășeni Erszakácsi
- Commune
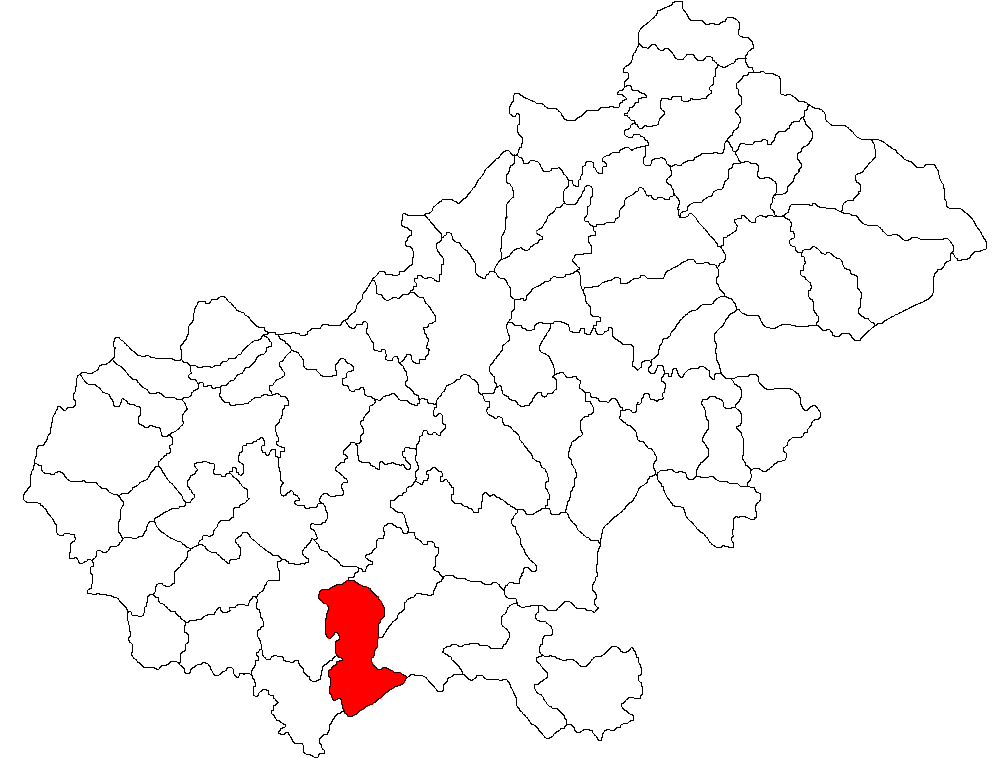
- Location in Satu Mare County

- Location in Romania
- Coordinates: 47°29′N 22°41′E
- Country: Romania
- County: Satu Mare
- Area: 82.65 km^{2} (31.91 sq mi)
- Population (2021-12-01): 1,134
  - Density: 14/km^{2} (36/sq mi)
- Time zone: EET/EEST (UTC+2/+3)
- Vehicle reg.: SM

Săcășeni (Hungarian: Érszakácsi; Hungarian pronunciation: [ˈeːrsɒkaːtʃi] is a commune of 1,297 inhabitants situated in Satu Mare County, Crișana, Romania. It is composed of two villages, Chegea (Kegye) and Săcășeni.

== Demographics ==
Ethnic groups (2002 census):

- Hungarians: 49.21%
- Romanians: 38.07%
- Romanies (Gypsies): 12.04%

According to mother tongue, 49.51% of the population speak Hungarian as their first language, while 42.70% speak Romanian.
