= Racșa =

Coordinates: 47°49′N 23°21′E

Racșa Ráksa
- Commune
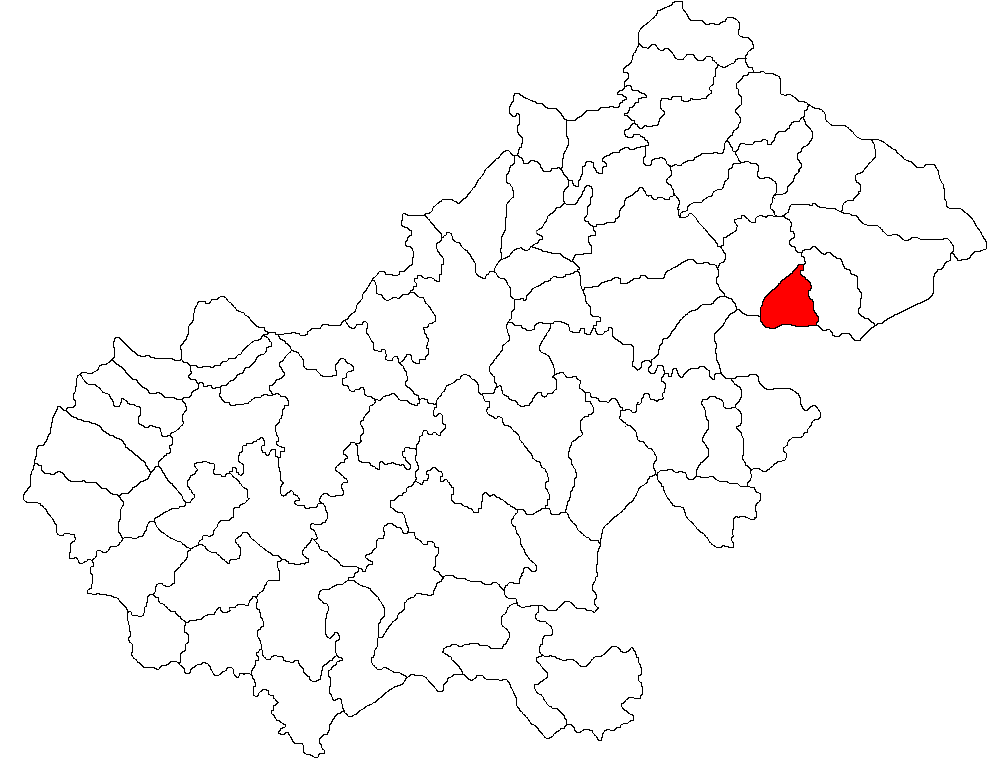
- Location in Satu Mare County

- Location in Romania
- Coordinates
- Country: Romania
- County: Satu Mare
- Population (2021-12-01): 3,050
- Time zone: EET/EEST (UTC+2/+3)
- Vehicle reg.: SM

Racșa (Hungarian: Ráksa) is a commune located in Satu Mare County, Romania. It is composed of two villages, Racșa and Racșa-Vii (Ráksahegy).

A commune until 1925, Racșa became part of Orașu Nou Commune that year and was again a separate commune from 1949 to 1956, when it was re-absorbed by Racșa Nou. In 2010, Racșa and Racșa-Vii were once again split off to form a commune.
