= Medieșu Aurit =

- Commune
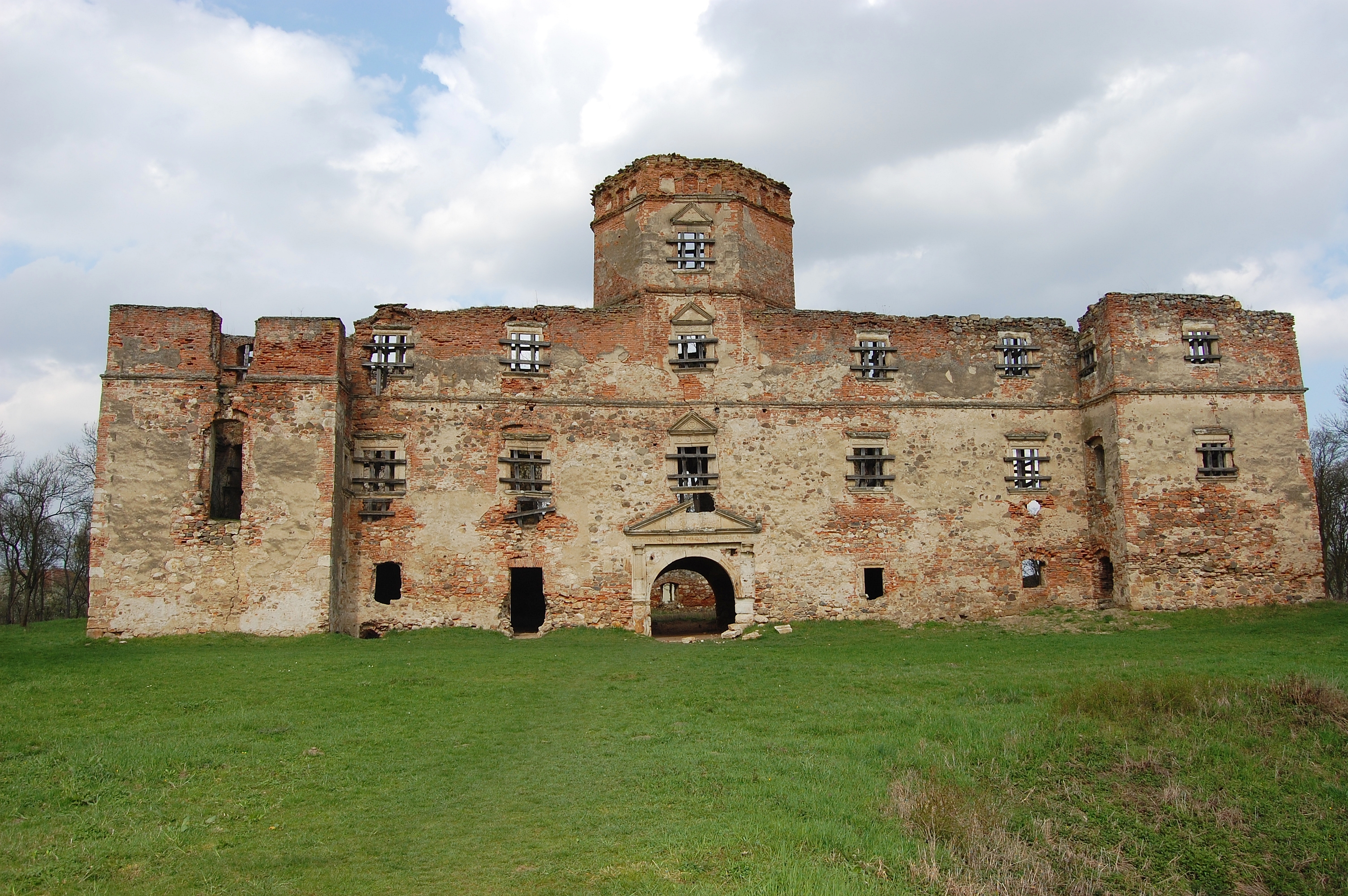
- Ruins of Lónyai castle in Medieșu Aurit

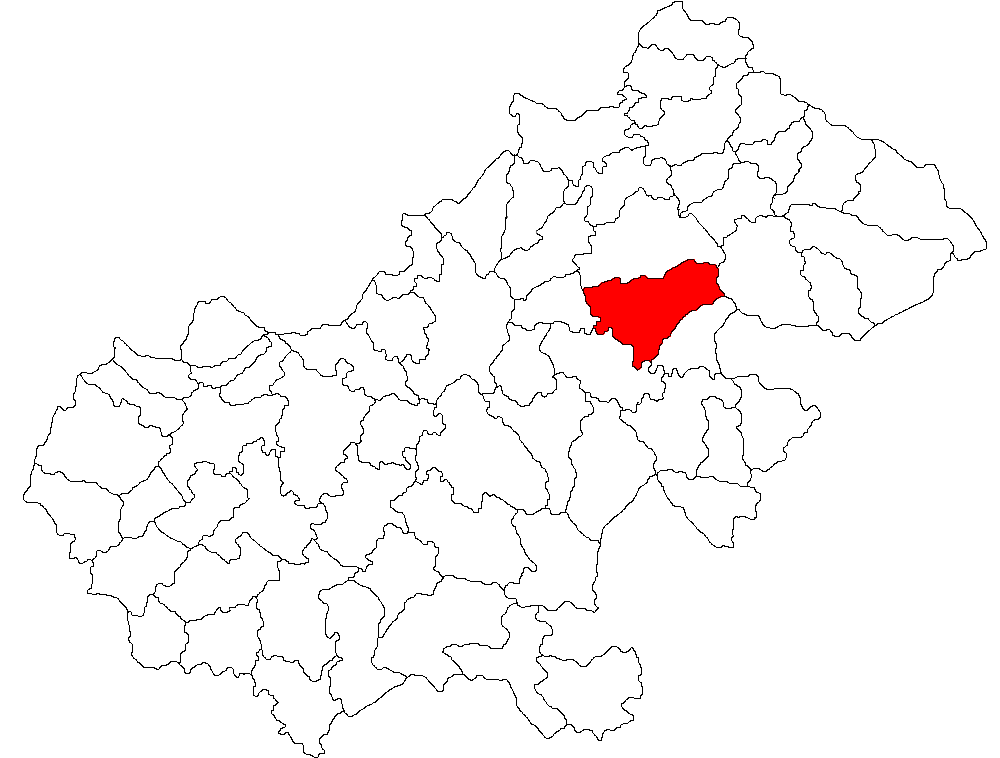
- Location in Satu Mare County

- Location in Romania
- Coordinates: 47°47′N 23°9′E
- Country: Romania
- County: Satu Mare

Government
  - Mayor (2020–2024): Marian Torok (PNL)
- Area: 103.28 km^{2} (39.88 sq mi)
- Elevation: 139 m (456 ft)
- Highest elevation: 160 m (520 ft)
- Lowest elevation: 115 m (377 ft)
- Population (2021-12-01): 6,224
  - Density: 60.26/km^{2} (156.1/sq mi)
- Time zone: UTC+02:00 (EET)
  - Summer (DST): UTC+03:00 (EEST)
- Postal code: 447185
- Area code: +40 261
- Vehicle reg.: SM
- Website: www.mediesuaurit.ro

Medieșu Aurit (Hungarian: Aranyosmeggyes [ˈɒrɒɲoʃmɛɟɟɛʃ]) is a commune of 6,224 residents in Satu Mare County, Romania. It is composed of seven villages: Băbășești (Szamosberence), Iojib (Józsefháza), Medieșu Aurit, Medieș-Râturi (Meggyesforduló), Medieș-Vii (Meggyeshegy), Potău (Patóháza), Românești (Szatmárgörbed).

== Geography ==
The commune is located on the right bank of the Someș River, in the eastern part of the county, at a distance of 21 km (13 mi) from the county seat, Satu Mare. The villages Băbășești and Potău were flooded by the Someș during the 1970 floods.

== Demographics ==
Historical population
Year	Pop.	±%
1880	5,628	—
1890	6,098	+8.4%
1900	7,084	+16.2%
1910	7,186	+1.4%
1920	7,152	−0.5%
1930	7,212	+0.8%
1941	7,967	+10.5%
1956	8,235	+3.4%
1966	8,537	+3.7%
1977	8,259	−3.3%
1992	7,015	−15.1%
2002	7,249	+3.3%
2011	6,683	−7.8%
2021	6,224	−6.9%
Source: INS, Census data

At the 2002 census, the commune had a population of 7,249, of which 78.50% were Romanians, 18.44% were Hungarians, and 2.53% were Roma; according to mother tongue, 21.06% of the population spoke Hungarian as their first language. At the 2011 census, there were 6,683 inhabitants, of which 73.68% Romanians, 15.07% Hungarians, and 7.09% Roma. At the 2021 census, Medieșu Aurit had a population of 6,224, of which 82.05% were Romanians, 8.64% Hungarians, and 1.08% Roma.
