= Dorolț =

Dorolț Pusztadaróc
- Commune
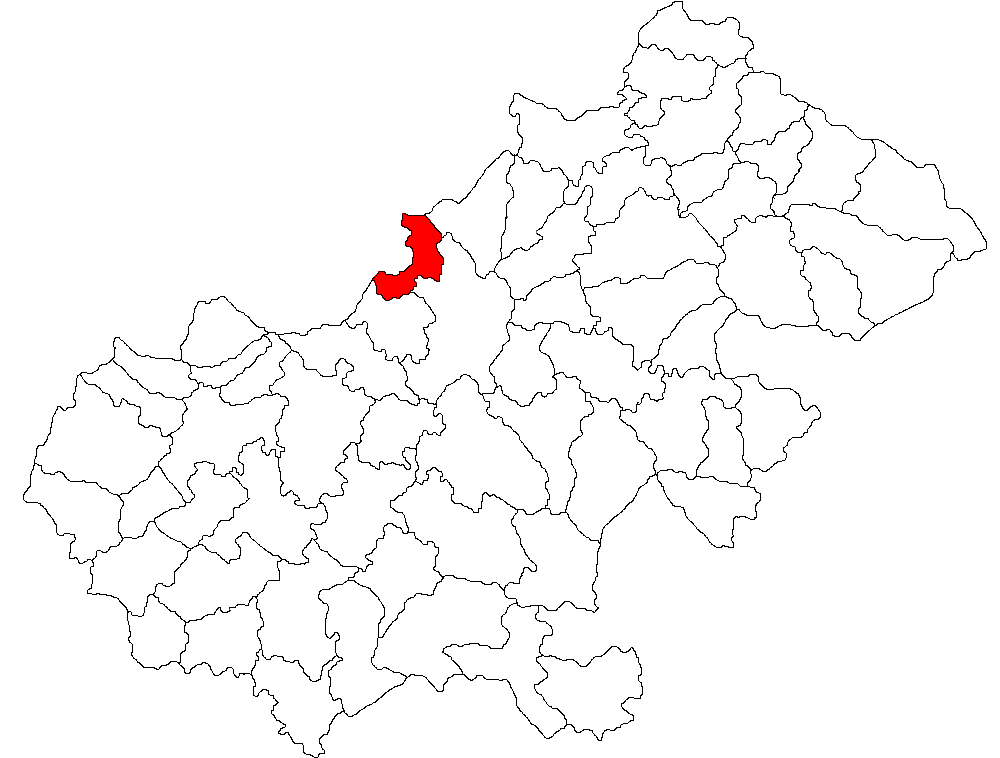
- Location in Satu Mare County

- Location in Romania
- Coordinates: 47°51′N 22°49′E
- Country: Romania
- County: Satu Mare
- Population (2021-12-01): 3,755
- Time zone: EET/EEST (UTC+2/+3)
- Vehicle reg.: SM

Dorolț (Hungarian: Pusztadaróc, Hungarian pronunciation: [pustɒdɒroːts]) is a commune with 3,760 inhabitants situated in Satu Mare County, Romania. It is composed of four villages: Atea (Atya), Dara (Szamosdara), Dorolț and Petea (Pete).

== Demographics ==
Ethnic groups (2011 census):

- Hungarians: (87.6%)
- Romanians: (5.4%)
- Romanies (Gypsies): (6.8%)

According to mother tongue, 95.24% of the population speak Hungarian as their first language.
