= Agriș =

Agriș Egri
- Commune
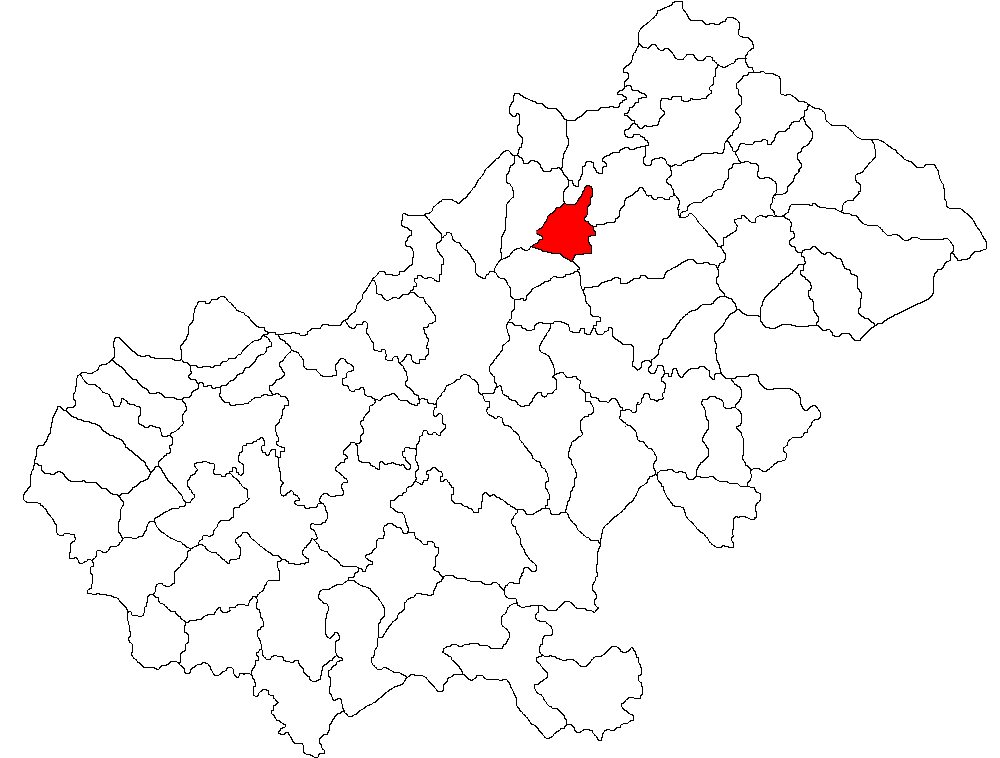
- Location in Satu Mare County

- Location in Romania
- Coordinates: 47°53′N 23°0′E
- Country: Romania
- County: Satu Mare
- Area: 24.22 km^{2} (9.35 sq mi)
- Population (2021-12-01): 1,758
  - Density: 73/km^{2} (190/sq mi)
- Time zone: EET/EEST (UTC+2/+3)
- Vehicle reg.: SM

Agriș (Hungarian: Egri; Hungarian pronunciation: [ɛɡri]) is a commune located in Satu Mare County, Romania. It is composed of two villages, Agriș and Ciuperceni (Gombástanya). Formerly part of Botiz Commune, the villages were split off in 2004 to form the separate commune of Agriș.
