= Orașu Nou =

Orașu Nou Avasújváros
- Commune
- Location in Satu Mare County

- Location in Romania
- Coordinates: 47.8328°N 23.2883°E
- Country: Romania
- County: Satu Mare

Government
  - Mayor (2020–2024): Gavril Mailát (UDMR)
- Area: 59.81 km^{2} (23.09 sq mi)
- Elevation: 157 m (515 ft)
- Population (2021-12-01): 3,389
  - Density: 57/km^{2} (150/sq mi)
- Time zone: EET/EEST (UTC+2/+3)
- Postal code: 447220
- Area code: +40 x59
- Vehicle reg.: SM
- Website: www.orasunou.ro

Orașu Nou (Hungarian: Avasújváros; Hungarian pronunciation: [ˈɒvɒʃuːjvaːroʃ]) is a commune of 7,100 inhabitants situated in Satu Mare County, Romania.

It is composed of five villages:

In Romanian	In Hungarian
Orașu Nou	Avasújváros
Orașu Nou-Vii	Nagyhegy
Prilog	Rózsapallag
Prilog-Vii	Rózsapallaghegy
Remetea Oașului	Kőszegremete

The villages of Racșa and Racșa-Vii were part of Orașu Nou from 1925 to 1949 and from 1956 to 2010, when they were split off to form Racșa Commune.

Orașu Nou is located in the northeastern part of the county, in the Oaș Country ethnographic region, on the border with Maramureș County. The commune is traversed by national road DN19, which connects it to the county seat, Satu Mare, 37 km (23 mi) to the west.

== Demographics ==
Ethnic groups (2002 census):

- Romanians: 63.37%
- Hungarians: 34.53%
- Roma: 4.78%

According to mother tongue, 63.40% of the population speak Romanian, while 36.43% speak Hungarian as their first language.
