= Cămărzana =

- Commune
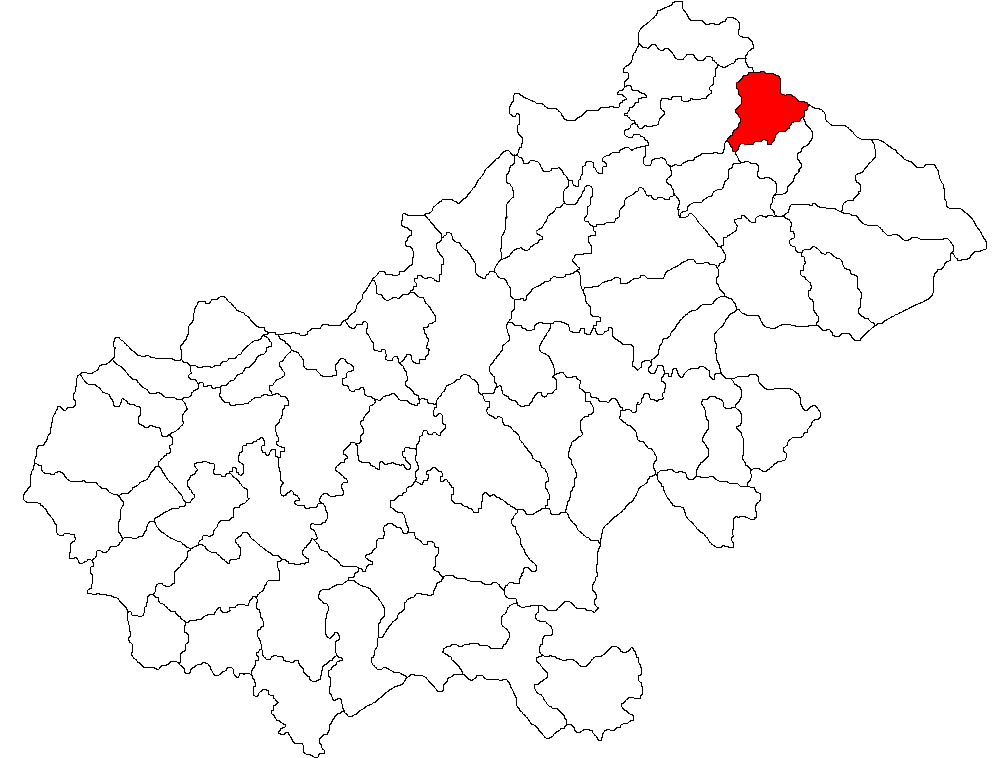
- Location in Satu Mare County

- Location in Romania
- Coordinates: 48°0′N 23°19′E
- Country: Romania
- County: Satu Mare
- Population (2021-12-01): 2,362
- Time zone: UTC+02:00 (EET)
  - Summer (DST): UTC+03:00 (EEST)
- Vehicle reg.: SM

Cămărzana ([kəmərˈzana], Hungarian: Komorzán, Hungarian pronunciation: [ˈkomorzaːn]) is a commune of 2,304 inhabitants situated in Satu Mare County, Romania. It is composed of a single village, Cămărzana.

The commune is located in the northern part of the county, on the border with Ukraine.
