= Gherța Mică =

- Commune
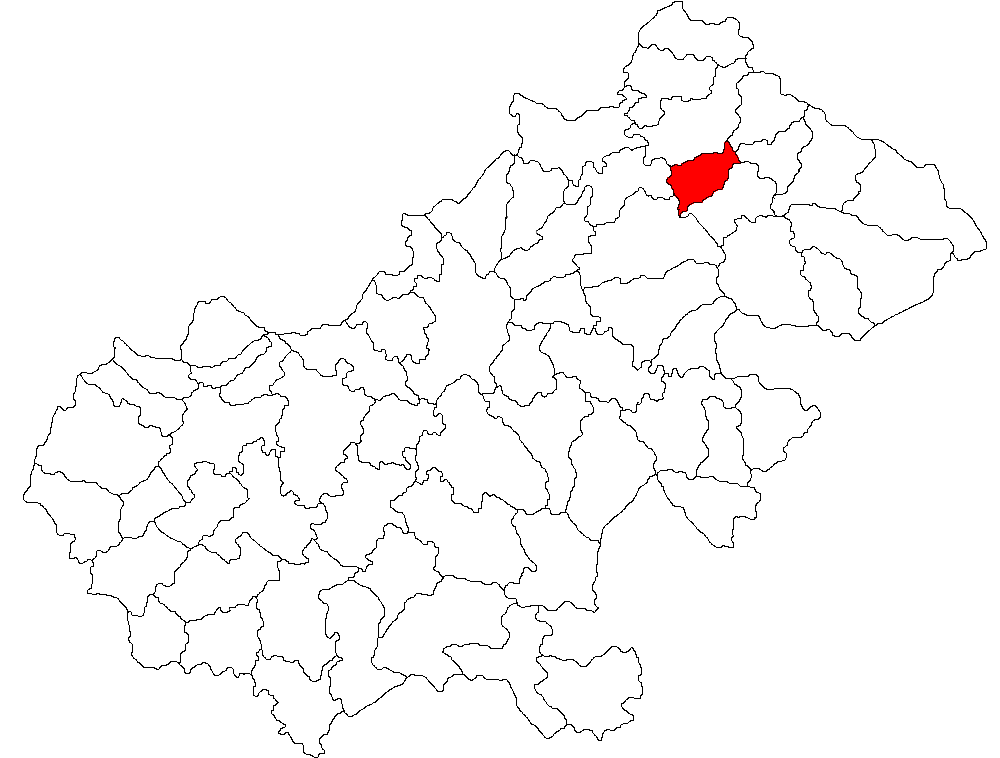
- Location in Satu Mare County

- Location in Romania
- Coordinates: 47°56′N 23°14′E
- Country: Romania
- County: Satu Mare

Government
  - Mayor (2020–2024): Ioan Ciuta (PSD)
- Area: 38.85 km^{2} (15.00 sq mi)
- Elevation: 160 m (520 ft)
- Population (2021-12-01): 3,881
  - Density: 100/km^{2} (260/sq mi)
- Time zone: EET/EEST (UTC+2/+3)
- Postal code: 447140
- Area code: +(40) 261
- Vehicle reg.: SM
- Website: www.primariaghertamica.ro

Gherța Mică (Hungarian: Kisgérce, pronounced: [kiʃɡeːrtsɛ]) is a commune situated in Satu Mare County, Romania. It is composed of a single village, Gherța Mică.

The commune is situated in the Țara Oașului ethnocultural and historical region in the northeastern part of Satu Mare County. It lies at an altitude of 160 m (520 ft), on the banks of the river Tur and its left tributary, the river Talna. Gherța Mică is located 38 km (24 mi) northeast of the county seat, Satu Mare, and belongs to the Satu Mare metropolitan area.

At the 2021 census, the commune had a population of 3,881; of those, 95.72% were ethnic Romanians.

== Natives ==
- Rodion Markovits (1888 – 1948), writer, journalist, and lawyer
- Maricica Țăran (born 1962), rower

== Education ==
Gherța Mică commune has 3 general schools and 4 kindergartens for children.
