= Târșolț =

- Commune
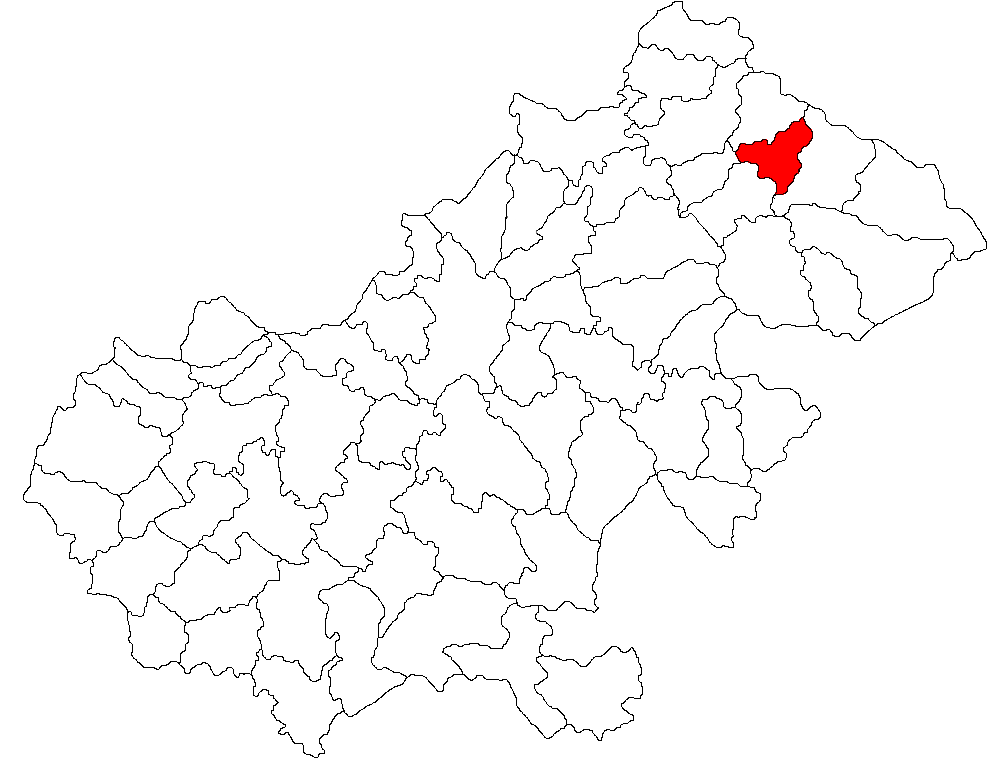
- Location in Satu Mare County

- Location in Romania
- Coordinates: 47°57′N 23°21′E
- Country: Romania
- County: Satu Mare

Government
  - Mayor (2020–2024): Grigore Pop (PNL)
- Area: 32.35 km^{2} (12.49 sq mi)
- Elevation: 169 m (554 ft)
- Population (2021-12-01): 3,079
  - Density: 95/km^{2} (250/sq mi)
- Time zone: EET/EEST (UTC+2/+3)
- Postal code: 447315
- Area code: +(40) x59
- Vehicle reg.: SM
- Website: primariatarsolt.ro

Târșolț (Hungarian: Tartolc; pronounced: [ˈtɒrtolts]) is a commune situated in Satu Mare County, Romania. It is composed of two villages, Aliceni (Kistartolc) and Târșolț.

At the 2011 census, the commune had 3,047 inhabitants, all of whom were ethnic Romanians; 62.8% were Greek-Catholic, 33.8% Romanian Orthodox, 1.4% Roman Catholic, and 1.2% Pentecostal. At the 2021 census, Târșolț had a population of 3,079, of which 95.52% were ethnic Romanians.
