= Satu Mare County =

County of Romania

Satu Mare County Județul Satu Mare Szatmár megye
- County
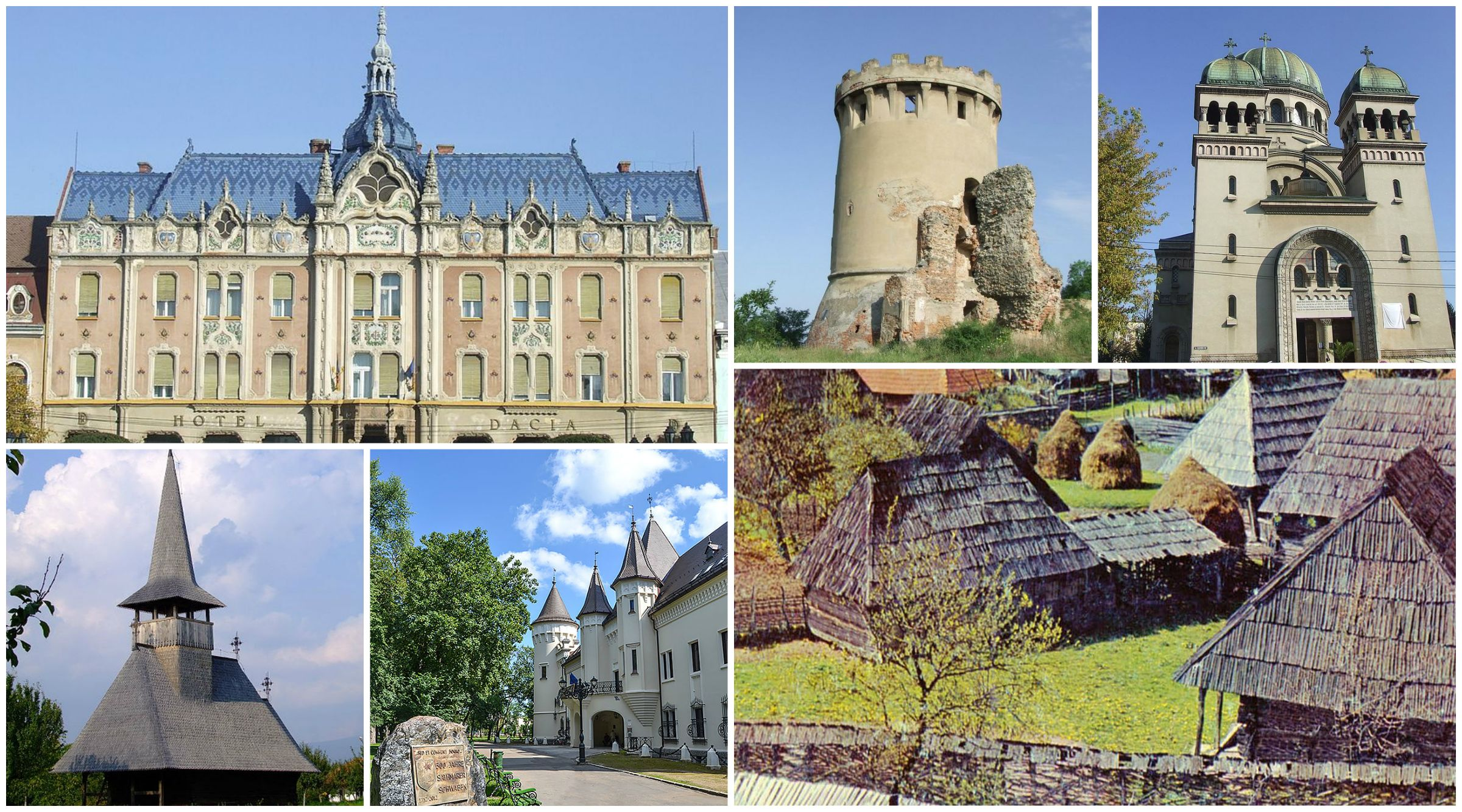

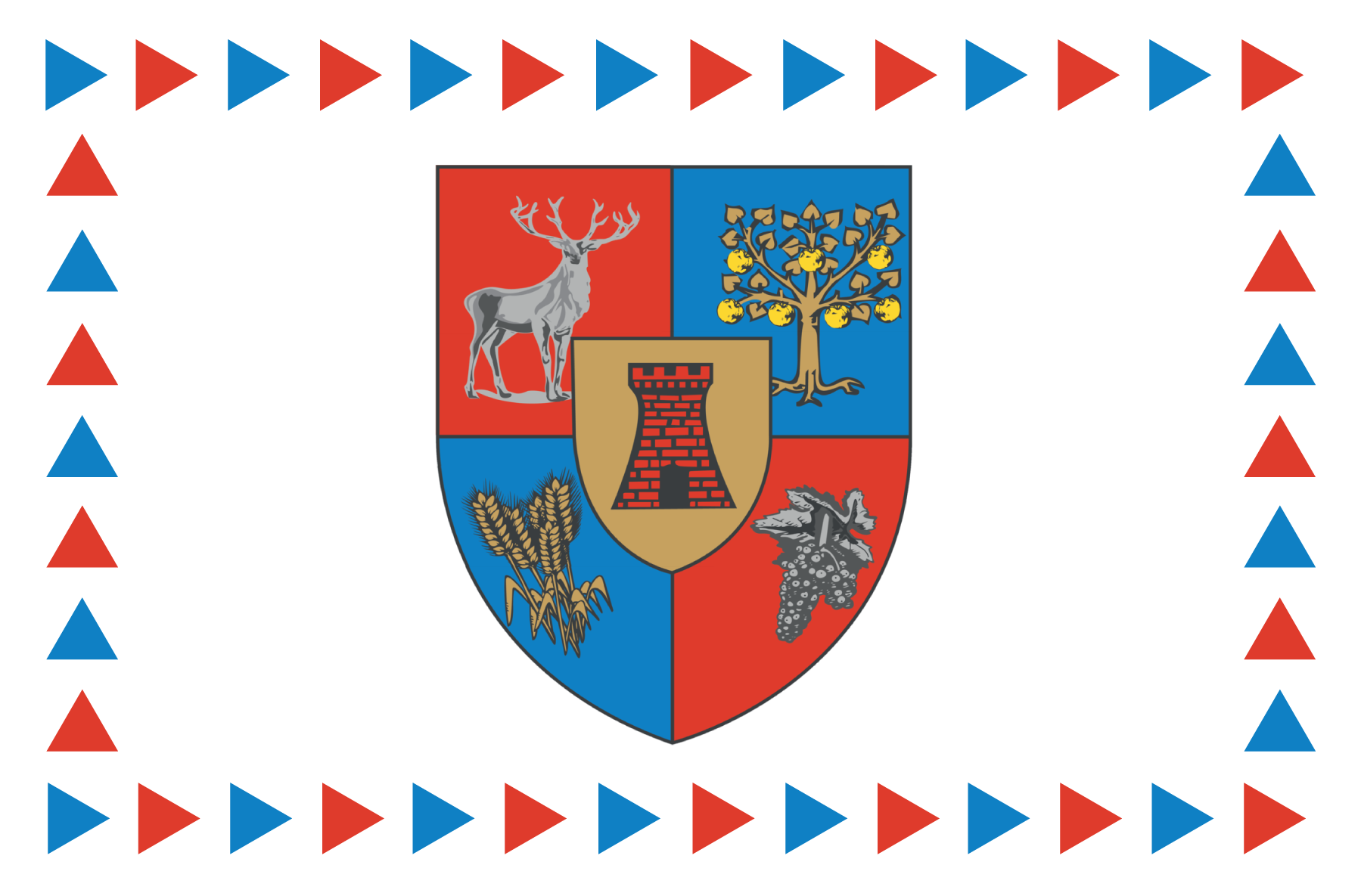
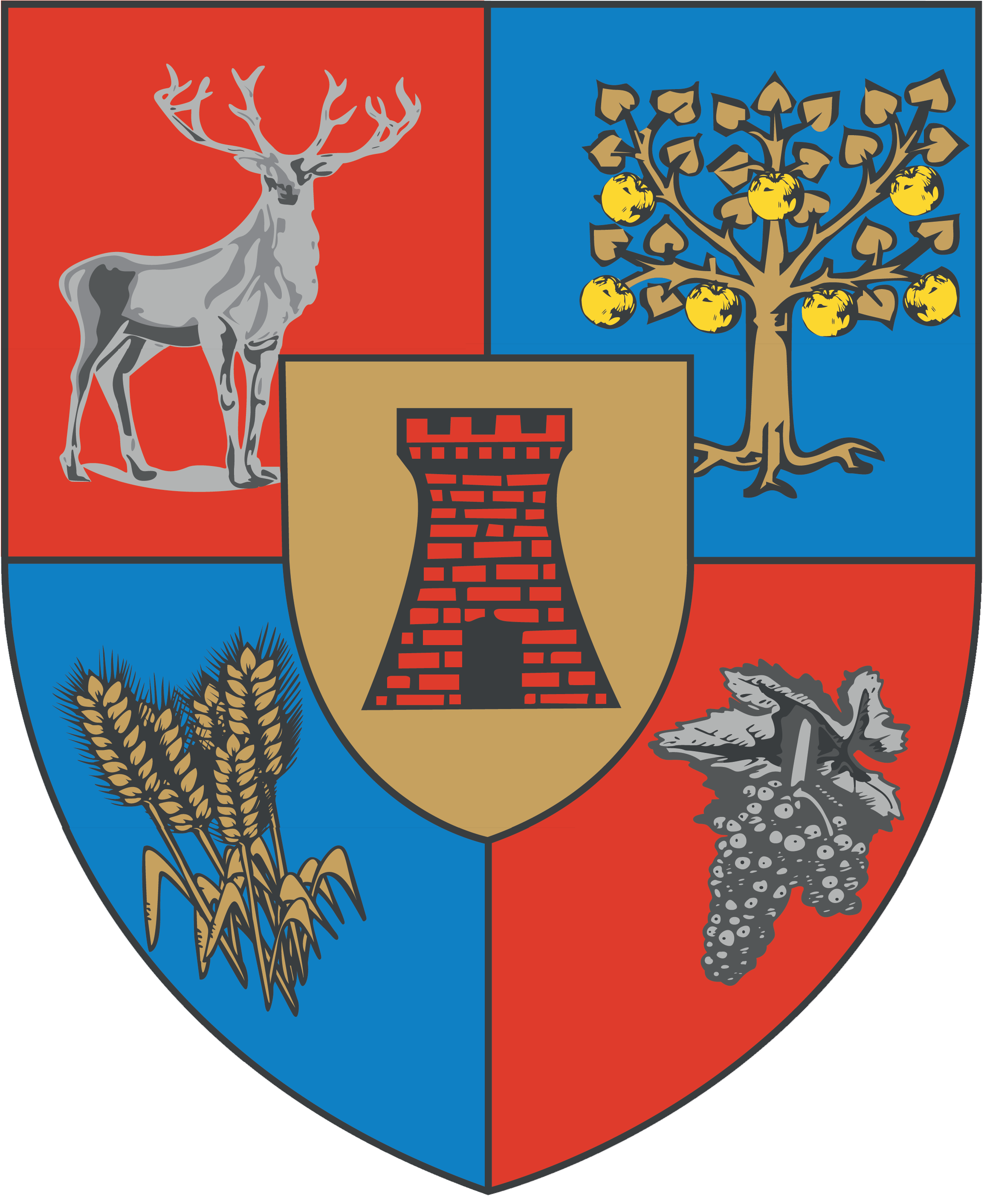
- Flag Coat of arms

- Coordinates: 47.69°N 22.89°E
- Country: Romania
- Development region: Nord-Vest
- Historical region: Maramureș
- Capital: Satu Mare

Government
  - President of the County Board: Csaba Pataki (UDMR)
  - Prefect: Ioan Tibil

Area
  - Total: 4,418 km^{2} (1,706 sq mi)
  - Rank: 36th

Population (2021-12-01)
  - Total: 330,668
  - Rank: 31st
  - Density: 74.85/km^{2} (193.8/sq mi)
- Telephone code: (+40) 261 or (+40) 361
- ISO 3166 code: RO-SM
- GDP (nominal): US$ 4.930 billion (2025)
- GDP per capita: US$ 14,909 (2025)
- Website: County Council; Prefecture

Satu Mare County (Romanian: Județul Satu Mare, pronounced [ˌsatu ˈmare], Hungarian: Szatmár megye) is a county (județ) of Romania, on the border with Hungary and Ukraine. The capital city is Satu Mare.

== Name ==
In Hungarian, it is known as Szatmár megye, in German as Kreis Sathmar, in Ukrainian as Сату-Маре, and in Slovak as Satmárska župa.

== Geography ==
Satu Mare County has a total area of 4,418 square kilometres (1,706 sq mi).

In the north are the Oaș Mountains, part of the Eastern Carpathians. This makes up around 17% of the area. The remainder is hills, forming 20% of the area, and plains. The western part of the county takes up the Eastern part of the Pannonian Plain.

The county is crossed by the Someș River, the Tur River, and Crasna River.

The county lies partly in the historical region of Maramureș and partly in the historical region of Crișana.

=== Neighbours ===
- Maramureș County in the East.
- Hungary in the West – Szabolcs-Szatmár-Bereg County.
- Ukraine in the North – Zakarpattia Oblast.
- Bihor County and Sălaj County in the South.

Satu Mare County, together with the Bihor, Bistrița-Năsăud, Cluj, Maramureș, and Sălaj counties, constitute the Nord-Vest development region of Romania. The county is a member of the Carpathian Euroregion.

== Demographics ==
According to the 2021 census, the county had a population of 330,668 and the population density was 74.8/km^{2} (193.8/sq mi).

Ethnic composition of Satu Mare County (2021)
1. Romanians (61.3%)
2. Hungarians (31.4%)
3. Romani (5.48%)
4. Germans (Sathmar Swabians) (1.25%)
5. Ukrainians (0.46%)
6. Others (0.10%)
Religious composition of Satu Mare County (2021)
1. Romanian Orthodox (51.5%)
2. Reformed (17.2%)
3. Roman Catholics (16.9%)
4. Greek Catholics (6.50%)
5. Pentecostals (4.32%)
6. Jehovah's Witnesses (1.18%)
7. Baptists (0.79%)
8. Others (0.92%)
9. Irreligious, atheist and agnostic (0.71%)

Year	County population
1948	312,672
1956	337,531 ▲
1966	359,393 ▲
1977	393,840 ▲
1992	400,789 ▲
2002	367,281 ▼
2011	344,360 ▼
2021	330,668 ▼

Satu Mare is a culturally diverse county, with a population mix of Romanians, Hungarians, Roma, Germans, and other ethnicities. The county's largest ethnic minority, Hungarians mostly reside along the border with Hungary, but some are also scattered throughout the whole county. Historically, Hungarians were concentrated in the cities, where administration resides, while the Romanian population was larger in the villages throughout the county. In 1930, the Hungarians represented 41.9% of the urban population in Satu Mare County and only 20.0% of the population in the villages according to census data. The proportion of different ethnic groups varied throughout history, due to regime and political changes. After the Austro-Hungarian Compromise of 1867, the Hungarian population increased its proportion greatly, in 1880 representing 44.4% and in 1910 reaching 55.1% of the county population, according to Árpád E. Varga. After World War I the Hungarian and German population declined.

== Economy ==
Satu Mare County benefits from its position, close to the border of Romania with Hungary and Ukraine, and it is one of the places which attracts foreign investment in industry and agriculture.

The predominant industries in the county are:

- Textiles industry;
- Machine and automotive components;
- Food industry;
- Wood and furniture industry.

== Tourism ==
The main tourist attractions in the county are:

- The "Oaș Country", with its strong Romanian folk traditions, on the North Eastern side of the county;
- The Oaș Mountains;
- The cities of Satu Mare and Carei;
- Tășnad Resort;
- The fortifications from Ardud and Medieșu Aurit.

== Politics ==
The Satu Mare County Council, renewed at the 2024 local elections, consists of 32 councilors, with the following party composition:

Party	Seats	Current Council
Democratic Alliance of Hungarians (UDMR/RMDSZ)	14	
Social Democratic Party (PSD)	8	
National Liberal Party (PNL)	7	
Alliance for the Union of Romanians (AUR)	3	

== Administrative divisions ==
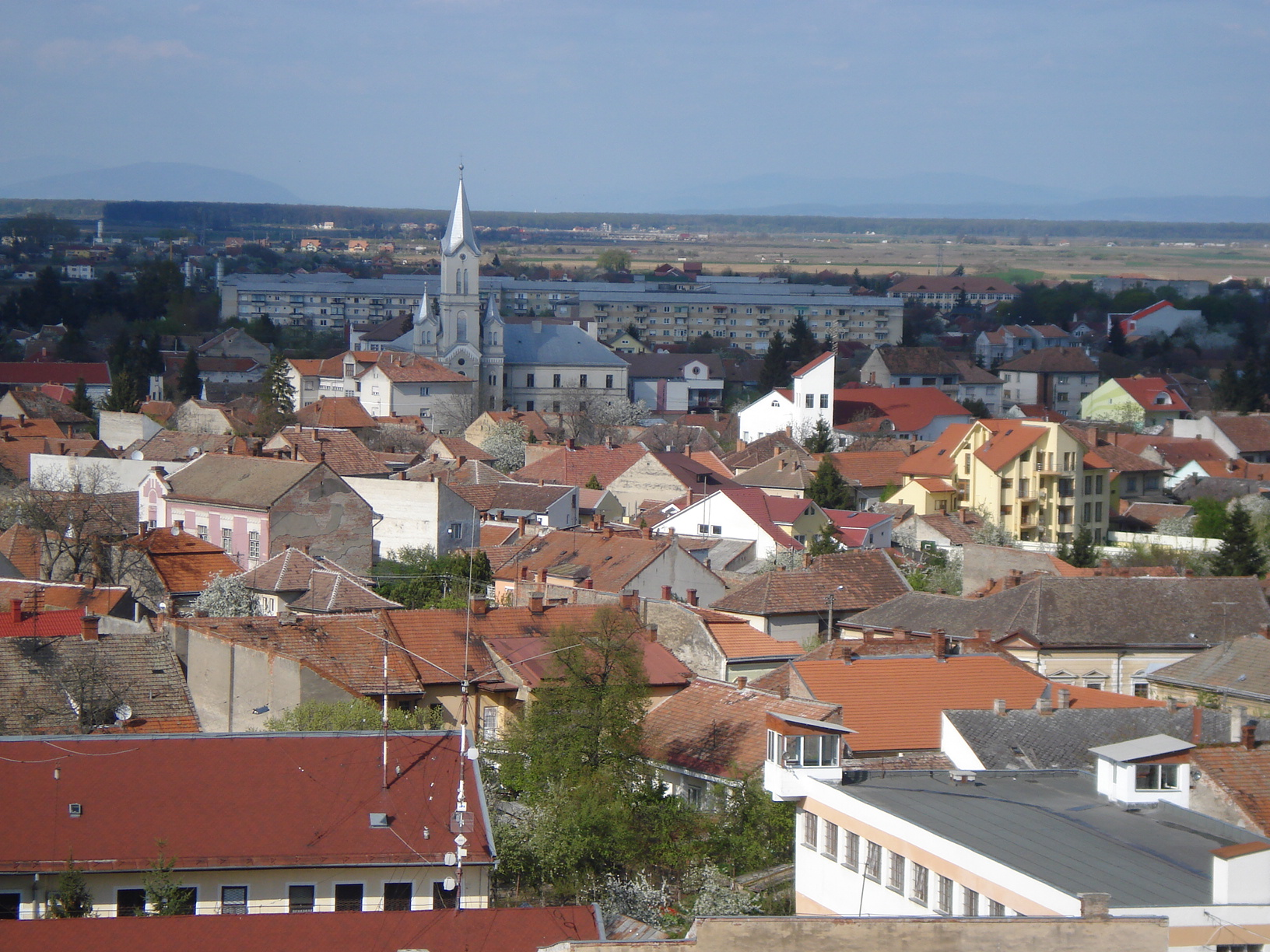
Satu Mare (German: Sathmar)

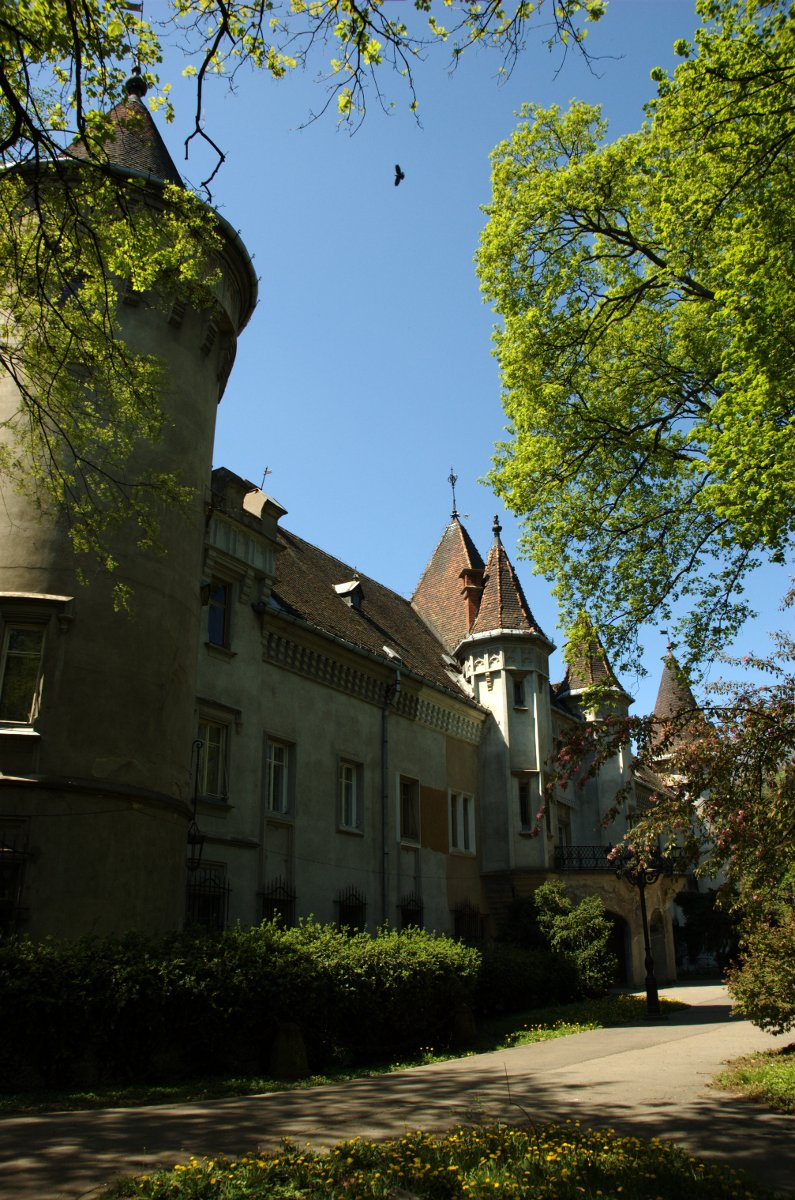
The Karolyi castle, Carei

Satu Mare County has 2 municipalities, 4 towns, and 59 communes:

- Municipalities
  - Satu Mare – county seat; 102,441 (as of 2011)
  - Carei
- Towns
  - Ardud
  - Livada
  - Negrești-Oaș
  - Tășnad
- Communes
  - Acâș
  - Agriș
  - Andrid
  - Apa
  - Bătarci
  - Beltiug
  - Berveni
  - Bixad
  - Bârsău
  - Bogdand
  - Botiz
  - Călinești-Oaș
  - Cămărzana
  - Cămin
  - Căpleni
  - Căuaș
  - Cehal
  - Certeze
  - Ciumești
  - Craidorolț
  - Crucișor
  - Culciu
  - Doba
  - Dorolț
  - Foieni
  - Gherța Mică
  - Halmeu
  - Hodod
  - Homoroade
  - Lazuri
  - Medieșu Aurit
  - Micula
  - Moftin
  - Odoreu
  - Orașu Nou
  - Păulești
  - Petrești
  - Pir
  - Pișcolt
  - Pomi
  - Porumbești
  - Racşa
  - Sanislău
  - Santău
  - Săcășeni
  - Săuca
  - Socond
  - Supur
  - Tarna Mare
  - Terebești
  - Tiream
  - Târșolț
  - Turț
  - Turulung
  - Urziceni
  - Valea Vinului
  - Vetiș
  - Viile Satu Mare
  - Vama

== Historical county ==
Județul Satu Mare
- County (Județ)
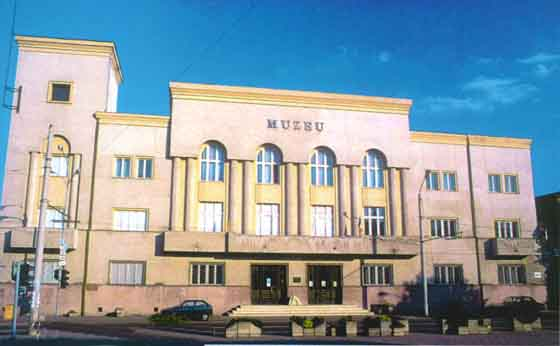
- Satu Mare County prefecture building during the interwar period.

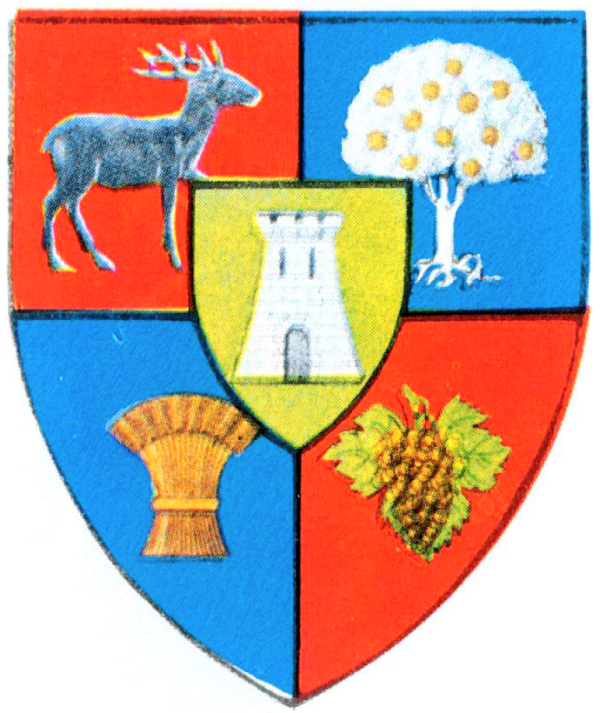
- Coat of arms

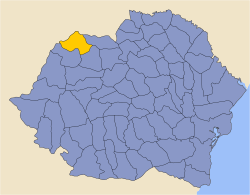
- Country: Romania
- Historic region: Maramureș
- Capital city (Reședință de județ): Satu Mare

Area
  - Total: 4,242 km^{2} (1,638 sq mi)

Population (1930)
  - Total: 294,875
  - Density: 69.51/km^{2} (180.0/sq mi)
- Time zone: UTC+2 (EET)
  - Summer (DST): UTC+3 (EEST)

Historically, the county was located in the northwestern part of Greater Romania, stretching to its borders with Czechoslovakia and Hungary. Its territory lay in the historical Crișana region. After the administrative unification law in 1925, the name of the county remained as it was, but the territory was reorganized. It was bordered on the northwest by Hungary, on the north by Czechoslovakia, to the east by Maramureș County, to the southeast by Someș County, and to the south and southwest by Sălaj County. Currently, its territory is included in the current counties of Satu Mare and Maramureș.

=== Administration ===
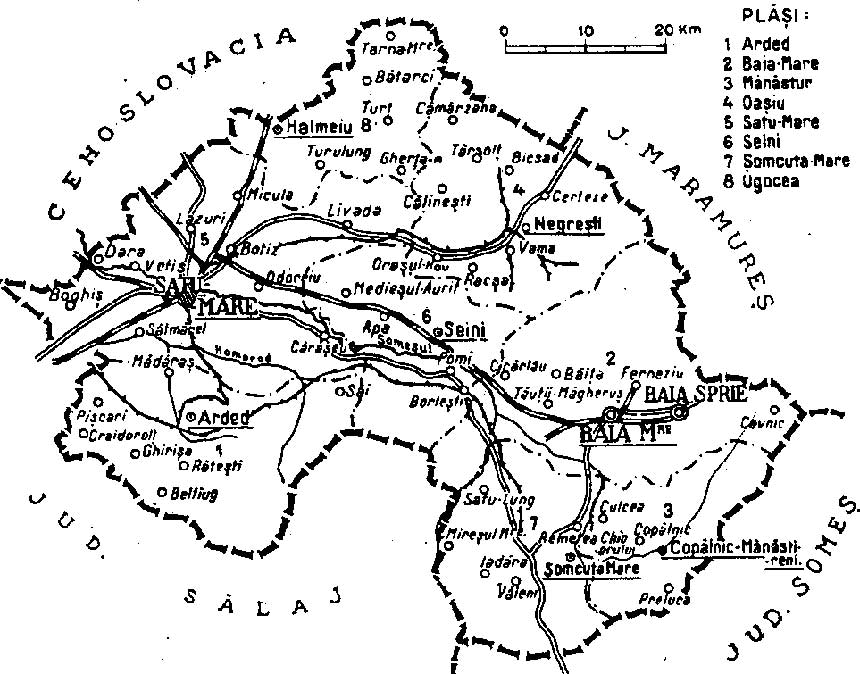
Map of Satu Mare County as constituted in 1938.

In 1930, the county was divided into eight districts (plăși):

1. Plasa Arded (headquartered at Arded)
2. Plasa Baia Mare (headquartered at Baia Mare)
3. Plasa Mănăștur (headquartered at Mănăștur)
4. Plasa Oașiu (headquartered at Oașiu)
5. Plasa Satu Mare (headquartered at Satu Mare)
6. Plasa Seini (headquartered at Seini)
7. Plasa Șomcuta Mare (headquartered at Șomcuta Mare)
8. Plasa Ugocea (headquartered at Ugocea)

The county included the city of Satu Mare (the county seat) and the urban communes Baia Mare and Baia Sprie.

=== History ===
Prior to World War I, the territory of the county belonged to Austria-Hungary and mostly was contained in the Szatmár County of the Kingdom of Hungary. In the aftermath of the war and the ensuing Hungarian–Romanian War, the Romanian Army entered the county in early 1919, and its administration passed to the Kingdom of Romania. The territory of Satu Mare County was transferred to Romania from Hungary as successor state to Austria-Hungary in June 1920 under the Treaty of Trianon.

In 1938, King Carol II promulgated a new Constitution, and subsequently he had the administrative division of the Romanian territory changed. 10 ținuturi (approximate translation: "lands") were created (by merging the counties) to be ruled by rezidenți regali (approximate translation: "Royal Residents") - appointed directly by the King - instead of the prefects. Satu Mare County became part of Ținutul Crișuri.

At the end of August 1940, the county was transferred back to Hungary with the rest of Northern Transylvania under the Second Vienna Award. In October 1944, Romanian forces with Soviet assistance recaptured the ceded territory, with the Battle of Carei marking the complete reintegration of Northern Transylvania into Romania. Romanian jurisdiction over the county per the Treaty of Trianon was reaffirmed in the Paris Peace Treaties, 1947. The county was disestablished by the communist government of Romania in 1950, and its territory became part of Baia Mare Region, which in turn was renamed the Maramureș Region in 1960. Satu Mare County was re-established in 1968, when Romania restored the county administrative system.

=== Population ===
According to the 1930 census data, the county population was 294,875, 60.5% Romanians, 25.2% Hungarians, 8.1% Jews, 3.2% Germans, as well as other minorities. From a religious point of view, the population consisted of 59.0% Greek Catholics, 15.0% Roman Catholics, 8.6% Jewish, 4.4% Eastern Orthodox, as well as other minorities.

==== Urban population ====
In 1930, the county's urban population was 69,526 inhabitants, 41.9% Hungarians, 35.0% Romanians, 18.6% Jews, 1.6% Germans, as well as other minorities. As a mother tongue in the urban area, Hungarian dominated (55.6%), followed by Romanian (31.1%), Yiddish (10.6%), German (1.4%), as well as other minorities. From the religious point of view, the urban population consisted of 33.7% Greek Catholics, 23.0% Reformed, 20.0% Jewish, 19.6% Roman Catholic, 2.9% Eastern Orthodox, as well as other minorities.

== See also ==
- Satmar (Hasidic dynasty), a Jewish religious group named after this place
- Szatmár County of the Kingdom of Hungary
