= List of rivers of Romania: T–U =

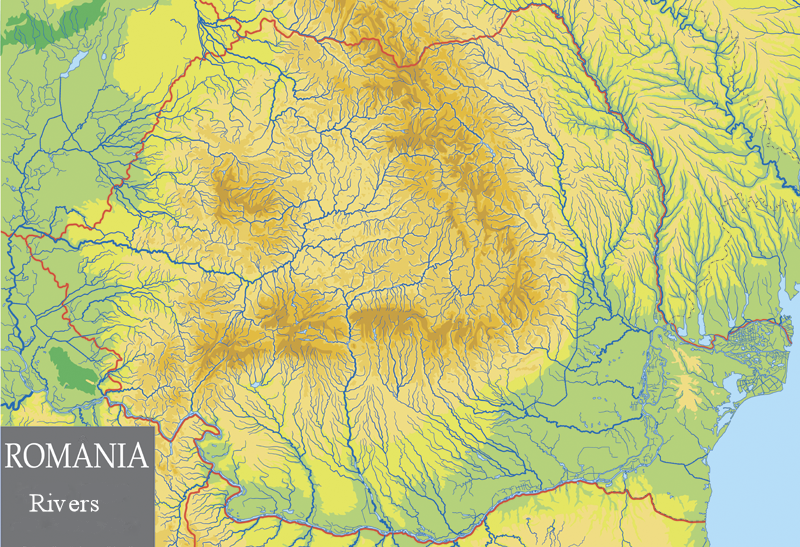
Map of Romania's hydrographic network

== T ==
River	Tributary of
Tăcășele	Crișul Alb
Taia	Jiul de Est
Taița	Lake Babadag
Talna	Tur
Talna Mică	Talna
Talpe	Crișul Negru
Tamarca	Jijia
Tămășești	Sălaj
Tănase	Bistrița
Tărâia	Olteț
Tărățel	Blahnița
Tărcăița	Crișul Negru
Tarcău	Bistrița
Tărcuța	Tarcău
Târgul	Șomuzul Mare
Tărhăuș	Trotuș
Tărlung	Râul Negru
Tarna Mare	Bătarci
Târnauca	Suceava
Târnava	Mureș
Târnava Mare	Târnava
Târnava Mică	Târnava
Tărtărău	Sebeș
Târzia	Râșca
Tășad	Crișul Repede

River	Tributary of
Țâța	Ialomița
Tătârlaua	Balta
Tău	Pogăniș
Tazlău	Trotuș
Tazlăul Sărat	Tazlău
Țebea	Crișul Alb
Tecșe	Aita
Tecucel	Bârlad
Tecuci	Vedea
Telcișor	Sălăuța
Teleajen	Prahova
Telega	Teleajen
Telejenel	Teleajen
Teleorman	Vedea
Telița	Lake Babadag
Teliu	Tărlung
Țelna	Ighiu
Terebici	Mureș
Teregova	Timiș
Țerova	Bârzava
Terpezița	Desnățui
Teslui	Olt
Teșna	Coșna
Tetila	Jiu
Teuz	Crișul Negru

River	Tributary of
Țibău	Bistrița
Țibleș	Brad
Țibleș	Someșul Mare
Țibrin	Danube
Ticuș	Olt
Tih	Răstolița
Timercea	Cigher
Timiș	Danube
Timiș	Ghimbășel
Timișana	Timiș
Timișaț	Timiș
Timișel	Gladna
Tinoasa	Pârâul Câinelui
Țipăul Mare	Zăbala
Tireu	Gurghiu
Tișița	Putna
Tismana	Jiu
Tișovița	Danube
Tisza (Tisa)	Danube
Tocbești	Gădălin
Tohăneanca	Ghighiu
Țolici	Topolița
Topa	Holod
Topla	Bunea

River	Tributary of
Toplița	Mureș
Toplița	Vâlsan
Topolița	Moldova
Topolnița	Danube
Topolog	Danube
Topolog	Olt
Topologel	Topolog
Toți	Sărata
Totoești	Bahlui
Trebeș	Bistrița
Trepteanca	Stăneasa
Treznea	Agrij
Tria	Barcău
Tritul	Valea Largă
Troaș	Mureș
Trotuș	Siret
Tur	Tisza
Turbați	Blahnița
Turcu	Bârsa
Turdaș	Mureș
Turia	Cașin
Turț	Tur
Tușnad	Olt
Tutana	Argeș
Tutova	Bârlad

== U ==
River	Tributary of
Ucea	Olt
Uibărești	Ribița
Uila	Luț
Umbrari	Moldova
Ungureni	Geamărtălui

River	Tributary of
Unirea	Mureș
Urdești	Elan
Urechioiu	Sitna
Uria	Olt
Urlătoarea	Prahova

River	Tributary of
Urlui	Călmățui
Urluia	Danube
Urmeniș	Sălaj
Urmeniș	Trotuș

River	Tributary of
Urșița	Stavnic
Urviș	Beliu
Usturoi	Săsar
Uz	Trotuș
