= Valea Rea =

Valea Rea may refer to the following places in Romania:

- Valea Rea, a village in the commune Văleni, Vaslui County
- Valea Rea, a tributary of the Bistra Mărului in Caraș-Severin County
- Valea Rea, a tributary of the Crișul Alb in Arad County
- Valea Rea, a tributary of the Desnățui in Dolj County
- Valea Rea, a tributary of the Doftana in Prahova County
- Valea Rea, a tributary of the Jaleș in Gorj County
- Valea Rea, a tributary of the Lotrioara in Sibiu County
- Valea Rea, a tributary of the Lotru in Vâlcea County
- Valea Rea, a tributary of the Milcov in Vrancea County
- Valea Rea, a tributary of the Miletin in Botoșani County
- Valea Rea, a tributary of the Nera in Caraș-Severin County
- Valea Rea, a tributary of the Orăștie in Hunedoara County
- Valea Rea, a tributary of the Prahova in Prahova County
- Valea Rea, another name for the upper course of the river Râul Doamnei in Argeș County
- Valea Rea, a tributary of the Sibișel in Hunedoara County
- Valea Rea, a tributary of the Suhu in Galați County
- Valea Rea (Tărățel), a tributary of the Tărățel in Gorj County
- Valea Rea (Tecucel), a tributary of the Tecucel in Galați County
- Valea Rea (Tur), a tributary of the Tur in Satu Mare County
- Valea Rea, a tributary of the Valea Bădenilor in Argeș County
