= Szatmár County =

County of the Kingdom of Hungary

Szatmár County Comitatus Szathmariensis (Latin) Szatmár vármegye (Hungarian) Komitat Sathmar (German) Comitatul Sătmar (Romanian)
- County of the Kingdom of Hungary (11th century-1526); County of the Eastern Hungarian Kingdom (1526-1570); County of the Kingdom of Hungary (1570-1606); County of the Principality of Transylvania (1606-1606); County of the Kingdom of Hungary (1606-1621); County of the Principality of Transylvania (1621-1629); County of the Kingdom of Hungary (1629-1645); County of the Principality of Transylvania (1645-1648); County of the Kingdom of Hungary (1648-1923, 1938-1945)
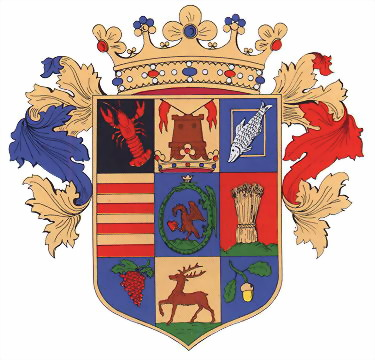
- Coat of arms

- Szatmár county between 1876 and 1920
- Capital: Szatmár; Nagykároly (1780-1920); Mátészalka (1920-1923); Szatmárnémeti (1940-1945)
- Area
  - Coordinates: 47°41′N 22°28′E
  - 1910: 6,287 km^{2} (2,427 sq mi)
- Population
  - 1910: 396,632
- History
  - Established: 11th century
  - Treaty of Trianon: 4 June 1920
  - Merged into Szatmár-Ugocsa-Bereg County: 31 December 1923
  - County recreated (after the First Vienna Award): 22 December 1938
  - Merged into Szatmár-Bereg County: 20 January 1945
- Today part of: Romania (4,505 km^{2}) Hungary (1,782 km^{2}) Ukraine (~0,4 km^{2})
- Carei; Satu Mare is the current name of the capital.

Szatmár County (Hungarian: Szatmár vármegye [ˈsɒtmaːr ˈvaːrmɛɟɛ]) was an administrative county (comitatus) of the Kingdom of Hungary, situated south of the river Tisza. Most of its territory is now divided between Romania and Hungary, while a very small area is part of Ukraine. The capital of the county was Nagykároly (now Carei).

== Geography ==
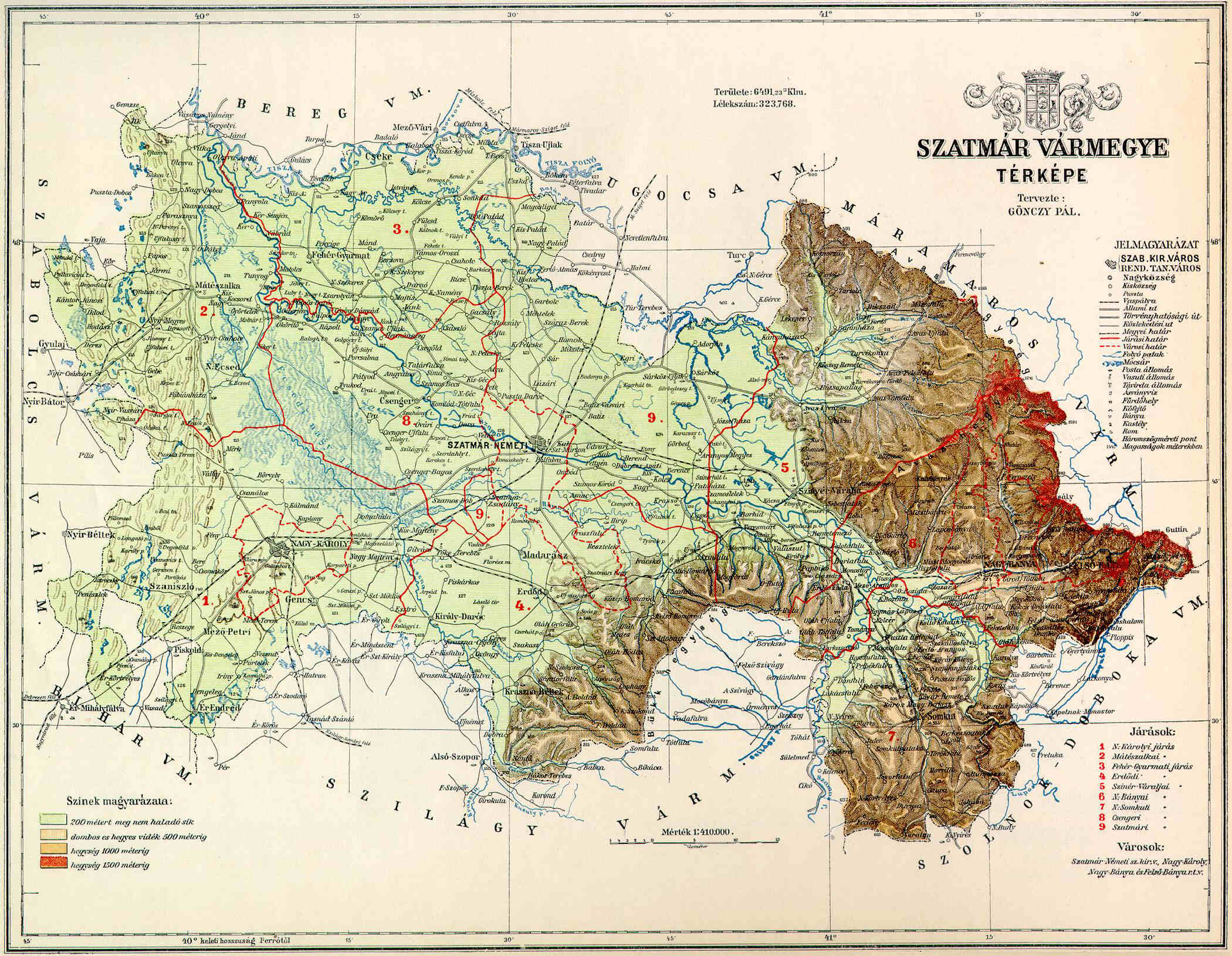
Map of Szatmár, 1891.

After 1876, Szatmár county shared borders with the former Hungarian counties of Szabolcs, Bereg, Ugocsa, Máramaros, Szolnok-Doboka, Szilágy and Bihar. It was situated south of the river Tisza. The rivers Crasna, Someş, Lăpuș and Tur flowed through the county. Its area was 6,257 km^{2} around 1910.

== History ==
Szatmár county was formed in the 11th century, with the center in Szatmárnémeti (now Satu Mare). In Ottoman times, the county mostly belonged to Partium. In 1876, when the administrative structure of the Kingdom of Hungary was changed, part of the territory of the former Kővárvidék/Chioar district was annexed to Szatmár.

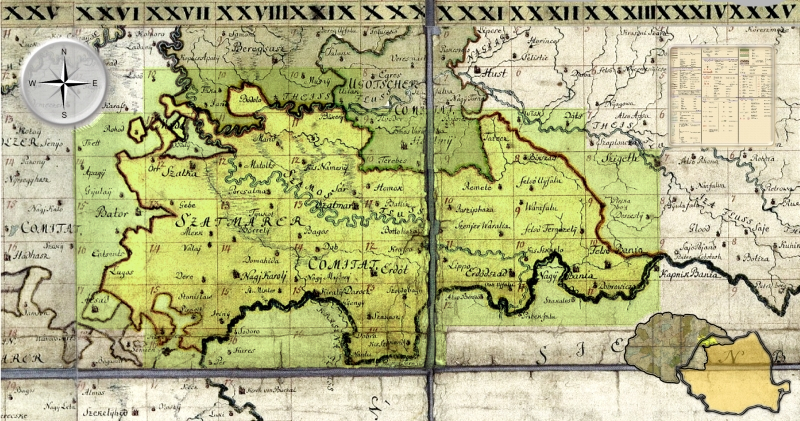
Szatmár County, 1782–85.

In 1920, the Treaty of Trianon assigned most of the territory of the county to Romania. The northwest of the county remained in Hungary, and formed the new county of Szatmár-Ugocsa-Bereg in 1923, with parts of the former Bereg and Ugocsa counties (the capital of this county was Mátészalka, which was previously in Szatmár county). The village of Nagypalád (now Velika Palad') was passed to Czechoslovakia in 1921, after a border adjustment agreement with Romania (according to the agreement, the villages of Akli/Okli and Fertősalmás/Fertesolmas were also passed to Czechoslovakia, whereas Bocskó/Bocicău, Ugocsakomlós/Comlăușa, Avaspatak/Valea Seacă and Nagytarna/Tarna Mare were passed to Romania).

By the First Vienna Award, Nagypalád was returned to Hungary and the county was recreated and later expanded with the Romanian part by the Second Vienna Award in 1940. After the end of World War II, this part became again part of Romania and Nagypalád was passed to the Soviet Union, while the remaining territory in Hungary was renamed to Szatmár-Bereg county.

In 1950, Szatmár-Bereg County was merged with large parts of Szabolcs county to form Szabolcs-Szatmár county. This county was renamed Szabolcs-Szatmár-Bereg in the 1990s.

The Romanian part of the county is now part of Satu Mare County, except for the easternmost part (including Baia Mare), which is in Maramureș County.

== Demographics ==
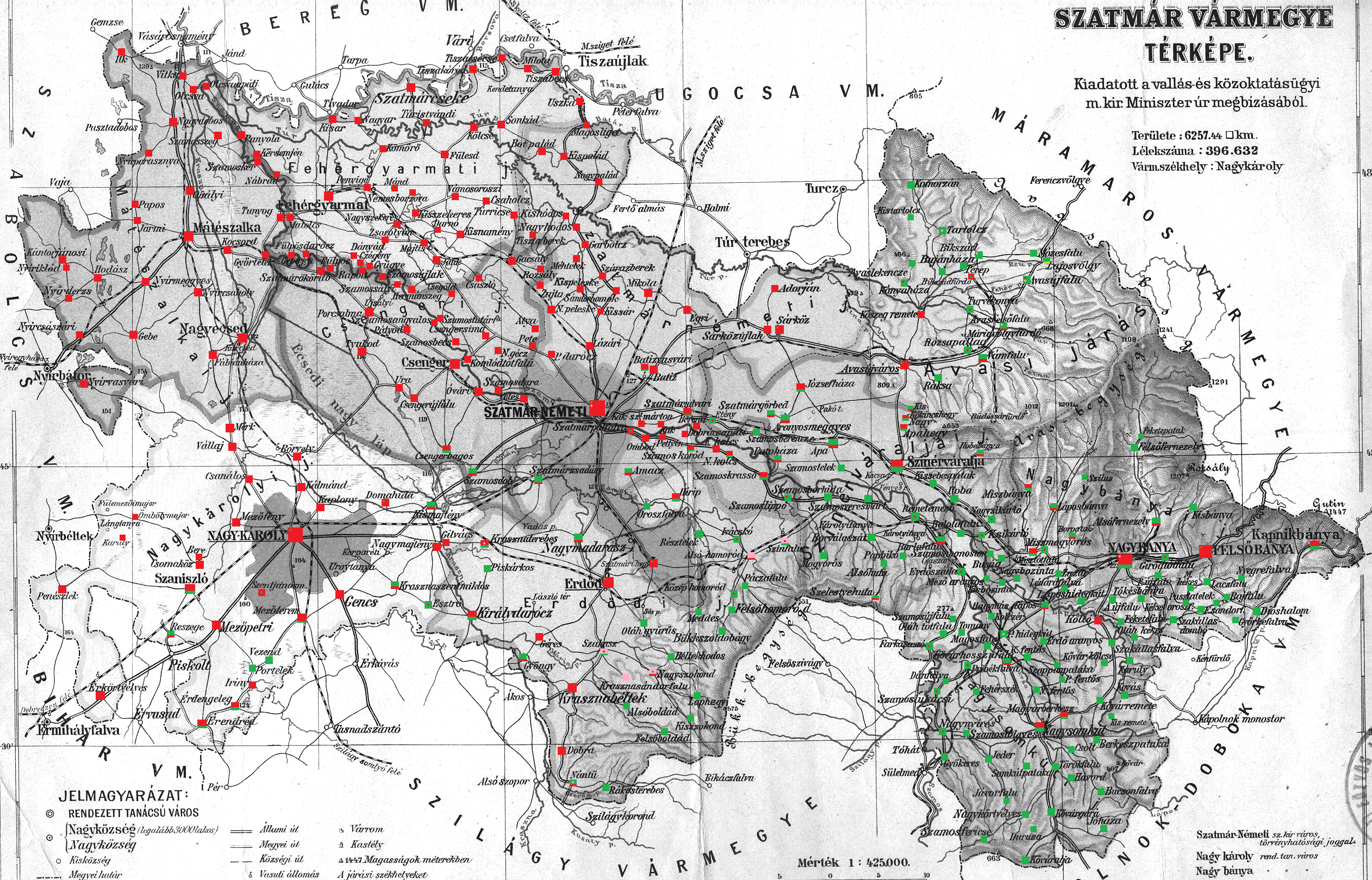
Ethnic map of the county with data of the 1910 census (see the key in the description).

Population by mother tongue (Note: Only linguistic communities > 1% are displayed.)
Census	Total	Hungarian	Romanian	German	Other or unknown
1880	293,092	167,284 (58.82%)	99,093 (34.85%)	13,948 (4.90%)	4,053 (1.43%)
1890	323,768	198,429 (61.29%)	107,947 (33.34%)	13,883 (4.29%)	3,509 (1.08%)
1900	367,570	235,015 (63.94%)	118,770 (32.31%)	11,763 (3.20%)	2,022 (0.55%)
1910	396,632	268,385 (67.67%)	119,760 (30.19%)	6,670 (1.68%)	1,817 (0.46%)

Population by religion (Note: Only religious communities > 1% are displayed.)
Census	Total	Greek Catholic	Calvinist	Roman Catholic	Jewish	Other or unknown
1880	293,092	125,686 (42.88%)	95,803 (32.69%)	47,953 (16.36%)	20,891 (7.13%)	2,759 (0.94%)
1890	323,768	138,505 (42.78%)	105,965 (32.73%)	53,506 (16.53%)	22,849 (7.06%)	2,943 (0.91%)
1900	367,570	156,063 (42.46%)	118,866 (32.34%)	62,803 (17.09%)	26,405 (7.18%)	3,433 (0.93%)
1910	396,632	168,870 (42.58%)	126,826 (31.98%)	67,924 (17.13%)	29,468 (7.43%)	3,544 (0.89%)

== Subdivisions ==
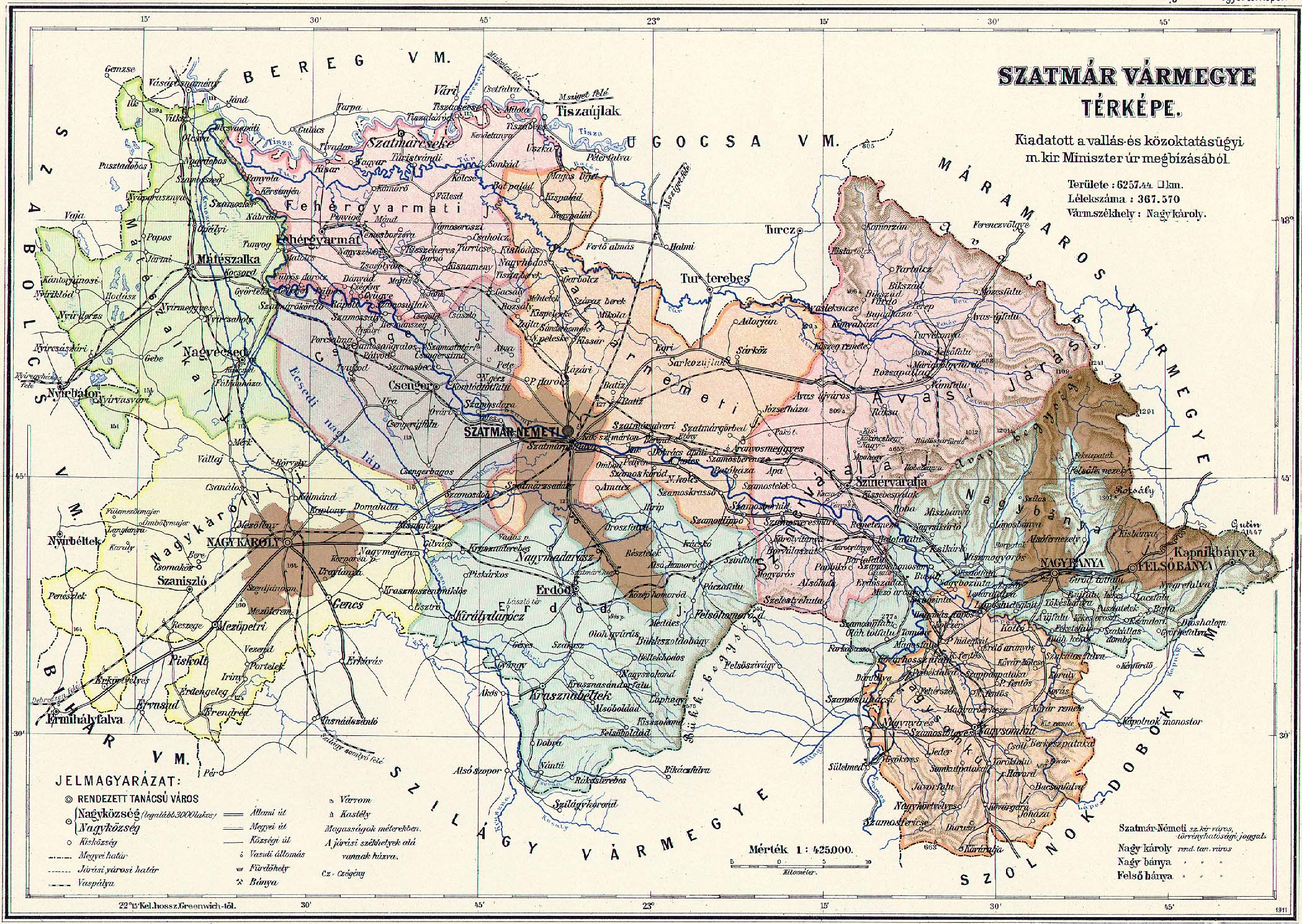

In the early 20th century, the subdivisions of Szatmár county were:

Districts (járás)
District	Capital
Avas (from early 20th century)	Avasújváros (now Orașu Nou)
Csenger	Csenger
Erdőd	Erdőd (now Ardud)
Fehérgyarmat	Fehérgyarmat
Mátészalka	Mátészalka
Nagybánya	Nagybánya (now Baia Mare)
Nagykároly	Nagykároly (now Carei)
Nagysomkút	Nagysomkút (now Șomcuta Mare)
Szatmárnémeti	Szatmárnémeti (now Satu Mare)
Szinérváralja	Szinérváralja (now Seini)
Urban counties (törvényhatósági jogú város)
Szatmárnémeti (now Satu Mare)
Urban districts (rendezett tanácsú város)
Felsőbánya (now Baia Sprie)
Nagybánya (now Baia Mare)
Nagykároly (now Carei)

Csenger, Fehérgyarmat and Mátészalka are now in Hungary; the other towns mentioned are now in Romania.

== See also ==
- Satu Mare County, Romania
