= Egher =

Egher may refer to:

- Egher (Batar), a river in Romania and Ukraine
- Egher (Tur), a river in Romania
- Egherul Mare, a river in Romania and Hungary
