= Lechincioara =

- Location within Romania

Location
- Country: Romania
- Counties: Satu Mare County

Physical characteristics
- Mouth: Valea Rea
  - coordinates: 47.9021°N 23.3388°E
- Length: 20 km (12 mi)
- Basin size: 95 km^{2} (37 sq mi)

Basin features
- Progression: Valea Rea→ Tur→ Tisza→ Danube→ Black Sea
- Tributaries
  - left: Bârloagele

The Lechincioara is a right tributary of the river Valea Rea in Romania. It discharges into the Valea Rea in Boinești. Its length is 20 km (12 mi) and its basin size is 95 km^{2} (37 sq mi). The lower course of the Valea Rea is also considered the lower course of the Lechincioara.
