= Șar =

Șar may refer to the following rivers in Romania:

- Șar, a tributary of the Cormoș in Covasna County
- Șar (Mureș), a tributary of the Mureș in Mureș County
- Șar (Tur), a tributary of the Egherul Mare in Satu Mare County
