= Egherul Mare =

Egherul Mare Nagy-Éger
- Location within Hungary Location within Romania

Location
- Countries: Romania and Hungary
- Counties: Satu Mare and Szabolcs-Szatmár-Bereg
- Villages: Micula; Bercu; Méhtelek

Physical characteristics
- Mouth: Tur
  - location: Túrricse, Hungary
  - coordinates: 47.9797°N 22.7946°E

Basin features
- Progression: Tur→ Tisza→ Danube→ Black Sea
- Tributaries
  - left: Șar

The Egherul Mare (Hungarian: Nagy-Éger) is a left tributary of the river Tur in Romania and Hungary. It discharges into the Tur near Túrricse.
