= Valea Albă (Tur) =

- Location within Romania

Location
- Country: Romania
- Counties: Satu Mare County
- Villages: Certeze

Physical characteristics
- Source: Oaș Mountains
- Mouth: Valea Rea
  - location: near Boinești
  - coordinates: 47.8966°N 23.3360°E
- Length: 21 km (13 mi)
- Basin size: 63 km^{2} (24 sq mi)

Basin features
- Progression: Valea Rea→ Tur→ Tisza→ Danube→ Black Sea

The Valea Albă is a left tributary of the Valea Rea in Romania. It discharges into the Valea Rea near Boinești. Its length is 21 km (13 mi) and its basin size is 63 km^{2} (24 sq mi).
