= Terebici =

Terebici Terebics-patak
- Location within Romania

Location
- Country: Romania
- Counties: Mureș County
- Villages: Călușeri, Icland, Ernei

Physical characteristics
- Mouth: Mureș
  - location: Sângeorgiu de Mureș
  - coordinates: 46.5870°N 24.5877°E
- Length: 17 km (11 mi)
- Basin size: 74 km^{2} (29 sq mi)

Basin features
- Progression: Mureș→ Tisza→ Danube→ Black Sea
- Tributaries
  - left: Tofalău

The Terebici (Hungarian: Terebics-patak) is a left tributary of the river Mureș in Transylvania, Romania. It discharges into the Mureș in Sângeorgiu de Mureș. Its length is 17 km (11 mi) and its basin size is 74 km^{2} (29 sq mi).
