= Târgu Mureș metropolitan area =

- Metropolitan area
- Interactive map of Târgu Mureș metropolitan area
- Coordinates: 46°32′N 24°33′E
- Country: Romania
- County: Mureș
- Central Municipality: Târgu Mureș
- Functional: 2005

Area
  - Total: 656.29 km^{2} (253.39 sq mi)

Population (2011 census)
  - Total: 209,532
  - Density: 314.6/km^{2} (815/sq mi)
- Time zone: UTC+2 (EET)
  - Summer (DST): UTC+3 (EEST)
- Postal Code: 540xyz1
- Area code: +40 x652
- Website: http://www.tgmures-metropolitan.ro/home

The Târgu Mureș metropolitan area is a metropolitan area in Târgu Mureș, Romania. It was founded in 2005. It has a population of 209,532 as of the 2011 census. It is Romania's only metropolitan area where Hungarians form the largest ethnic group, with 98,593 people. The Romanian population is 95,867. Other ethnicities include Romani, Germans, Italians, and Jews.

As defined by Eurostat, the Târgu Mureș functional urban area has a population of 180,922 residents (as of 2015).

== Composition ==
Tărgu Mureș metropolitan area (2011)
Cities/Communes	Population	Romanians	Hungarians	Other
Târgu Mureș	134,290	69,702	60,669	3,919
Sângeorgiu de Mureș	9,304	3,435	4,681	1,188
Sâncraiu de Mureș	7,489	4,671	2,254	564
Ungheni	6,945	5,039	580	977
Pănet	6,033	739	4,707	587
Ceuașu de Câmpie	5,964	2,547	2,624	793
Ernei	5,835	452	4,284	1,099
Cristești	5,824	2,465	2,512	847
Sântana de Mureș	5,723	2,868	2,309	546
Acățari	4,738	91	4,067	580
Crăciunești	4,470	110	2,827	1,533
Sânpaul	4,233	1,309	1,466	1,458
Livezeni	3,266	1,008	1,640	618
Gheorghe Doja	2,982	617	2,169	196
Corunca	2,785	814	1,804	167
Total	209,532	95,867	98,593	15,072
Percentage	100%	45.8%	47.1%	7.1%
