= Valea Muntelui =

Valea Muntelui may refer to:

- Valea Muntelui, a tributary of the Iza in Maramureș County, Romania
- Valea Muntelui, a tributary of the Valea Caselor in Sibiu County, Romania
- Valea Muntelui (Talna), a river in Satu Mare County, Romania
