= Malut =

Malut may refer to:

- Măluț, a village in Braniștea, Bistrița-Năsăud, Romania
- An abbreviation for the Indonesian province of North Maluku (Maluku Utara)
  - Malut United FC, an Indonesian football team.
- Măluț River, a tributary of the Talna River, Romania

== See also ==
- Malout, town in Punjab, India.
