= Șar (Tur) =

Șar Noroieni
- Location within Romania

Location
- Country: Romania
- Counties: Satu Mare County
- Villages: Botiz, Noroieni

Physical characteristics
- Mouth: Egherul Mare
  - coordinates: 47.9208°N 22.8589°E
- Length: 23 km (14 mi)
- Basin size: 111 km^{2} (43 sq mi)

Basin features
- Progression: Egherul Mare→ Tur→ Tisza→ Danube→ Black Sea

The Șar (also: Noroieni) is a left tributary of the river Egherul Mare in Romania. It flows into the Egherul Mare on the border with Hungary, near the village Pelișor. Its length is 23 km (14 mi) and its basin size is 111 km^{2} (43 sq mi).
