= Egher (Batar) =

- Location within Zakarpattia Oblast Location within Romania

Location
- Country: Romania, Ukraine
- Counties: Satu Mare County, Zakarpattia Oblast
- Villages: Tămășeni

Physical characteristics
- Mouth: Batar
  - coordinates: 48.0343°N 22.9910°E

Basin features
- Progression: Batar→ Tisza→ Danube→ Black Sea
- Tributaries
  - left: Hodoș

The Egher is a left tributary of the river Batar in Romania and Ukraine. It discharges into the Batar near Nevetlenfolu, Vynohradiv Raion.
