= Tarna Mare (river) =

- Location within Romania

Location
- Country: Romania
- Counties: Satu Mare County
- Villages: Tarna Mare, Bocicău

Physical characteristics
- Mouth: Bătarci
  - coordinates: 48.0695°N 23.1156°E
- Length: 17 km (11 mi)
- Basin size: 51 km^{2} (20 sq mi)

Basin features
- Progression: Bătarci→ Batar→ Tisza→ Danube→ Black Sea

The Tarna Mare is a right tributary of the river Bătarci in Romania. It flows into the Bătarci near Șirlău. Its length is 17 km (11 mi) and its basin size is 51 km^{2} (20 sq mi).
