= Telița (river) =

- Location within Romania

Location
- Country: Romania
- Counties: Tulcea County
- Villages: Telița, Frecăței, Cataloi, Mihail Kogălniceanu

Physical characteristics
- Mouth: Lake Babadag
  - coordinates: 44.9424°N 28.7490°E
- Length: 48 km (30 mi)
- Basin size: 287 km^{2} (111 sq mi)

Basin features
- Progression: Lake Babadag→ Lake Razim
- Tributaries
  - right: Cilic, Hagilar

The Telița is a river in Tulcea County, Romania. Near Zebil it discharges into Lake Babadag, which is connected with Lake Razim, a former lagoon of the Black Sea. Its length is 48 km (30 mi) and its basin size is 287 km^{2} (111 sq mi).
