= Tecucel =

- Location within Romania

Location
- Country: Romania
- Counties: Galați County
- Villages: Buciumeni, Vizurești, Dobrinești, Tecuci

Physical characteristics
- Mouth: Bârlad
  - location: Tecuci
  - coordinates: 45.8358°N 27.4424°E
- Length: 28 km (17 mi)
- Basin size: 112 km^{2} (43 sq mi)

Basin features
- Progression: Bârlad→ Siret→ Danube→ Black Sea
- Tributaries
  - right: Valea Rea

The Tecucel is a right tributary of the river Bârlad in Romania. It discharges into the Bârlad in the city of Tecuci. Its length is 28 km (17 mi) and its basin size is 112 km^{2} (43 sq mi).
