= Bătarci (river) =

Bătarci Батарч
- Location within Romania Location within Zakarpattia Oblast

Location
- Country: Romania, Ukraine
- Counties: Satu Mare County, Zakarpattia Oblast
- Villages: Bătarci

Physical characteristics
- Mouth: Batar
  - coordinates: 48.0552°N 23.0823°E

Basin features
- Progression: Batar→ Tisza→ Danube→ Black Sea
- Tributaries
  - right: Tarna Mare

The Bătarci (Ukrainian: Батарч, romanized: Batarch) is a left tributary of the river Batar in Romania and Ukraine. It discharges into the Batar in Kholmovets, Vynohradiv Raion.
