= Valea Muntelui (Talna) =

- Location within Romania

Location
- Country: Romania
- Counties: Satu Mare County
- Villages: Racșa

Physical characteristics
- Mouth: Talna
  - location: Orașu Nou
  - coordinates: 47.8415°N 23.2975°E

Basin features
- Progression: Talna→ Tur→ Tisza→ Danube→ Black Sea

The Valea Muntelui is a left tributary of the river Talna in Romania. It flows into the Talna in Orașu Nou. Its length is 9 km (5.6 mi) and its basin size is 16 km^{2} (6.2 sq mi).
