= Corunca =

Corunca Koronka
- Commune
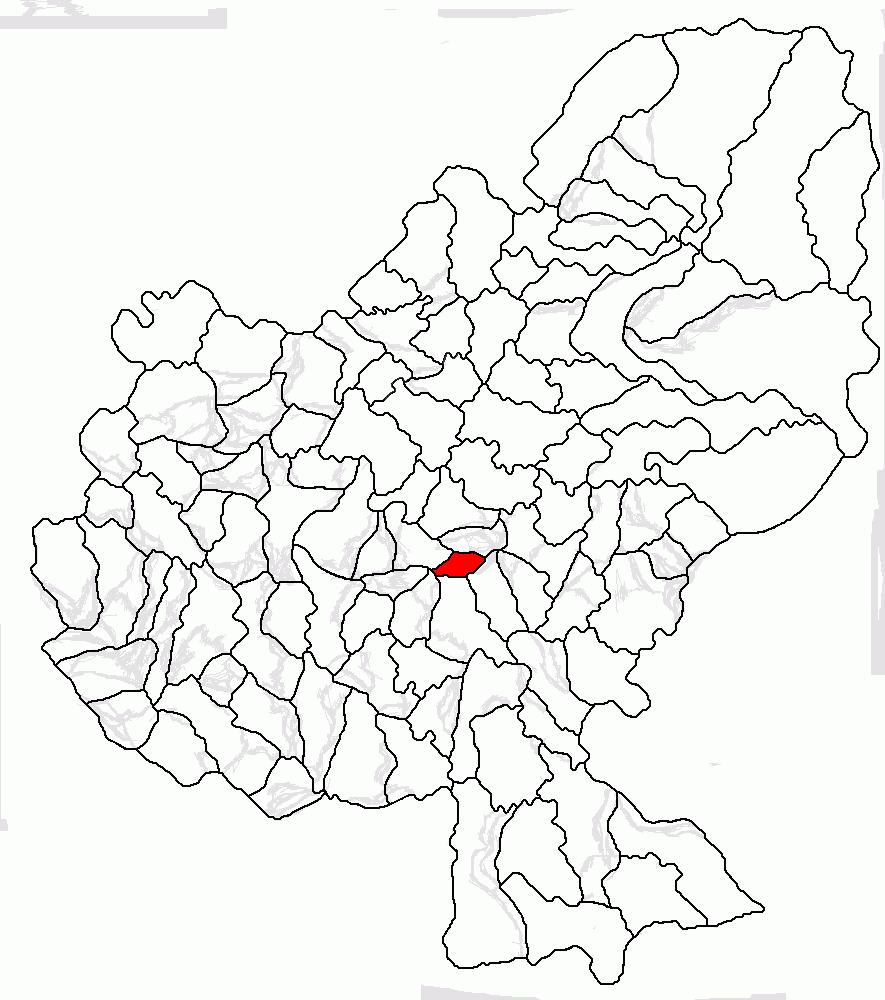
- Location in Mureș County

- Location in Romania
- Coordinates: 46°31′N 24°37′E
- Country: Romania
- County: Mureș

Government
  - Mayor (2020–2024): Szabolcs-István Takács (UDMR)
- Area: 16.85 km^{2} (6.51 sq mi)
- Elevation: 349 m (1,145 ft)
- Population (2021-12-01): 4,407
  - Density: 261.5/km^{2} (677.4/sq mi)
- Time zone: UTC+02:00 (EET)
  - Summer (DST): UTC+03:00 (EEST)
- Postal code: 547363
- Area code: +40 265
- Vehicle reg.: MS
- Website: www.primariacorunca.ro

Corunca (Hungarian: Koronka, Hungarian pronunciation: [koronkɒ]) is a commune in Mureș County, Transylvania, Romania. The commune is composed of two villages: Bozeni (Székelybós) and Corunca. It became an independent commune when the component villages split from Livezeni in 2004.

== Geography ==
The commune is situated on the Transylvanian Plateau, at altitude of 349 m (1,145 ft). It is located in the central part of Mureș County, 6.4 km (4 mi) southeast of the county seat, Târgu Mureș, and part of the Târgu Mureș metropolitan area. Corunca is crossed by national road DN13 (part of European route E60), which starts in Târgu Mureș, continues to Sighișoara, 50 km (31 mi) to the south, and ends in Brașov.

== History ==
The area where the commune lies was inhabited even in ancient times. On the outskirts of the villages, remains were found from prehistoric and Roman times. The name of the present-day commune was first recorded in 1332 as Korunka. In the vicinity, there used to be two other villages, Sárvári was destroyed in the 16th century while Kisernye was devastated in 1661 by Ottoman Turkish troops.

The village was historically part of the Székely Land in Transylvania and belonged to Marosszék in the Middle Ages. In the mid-1780s as part of the Josephine administrative reform, Marosszék was integrated into Küküllő County, however, the szék-system was restored in 1790. After the suppression of the Hungarian Revolution in 1849, the village formed part of the Székelykál military sub-division of the Marosvásárhely division in the Udvarhely military district. Between 1861 and 1876, the former Marosszék was restored. As a result of the administrative reform in 1876, the village fell within Maros-Torda County in the Kingdom of Hungary.

In the aftermath of World War I, the Union of Transylvania with Romania was declared in December 1918. At the start of the Hungarian–Romanian War of 1918–1919, the locality passed under Romanian administration. It officially became part of the territory ceded to the Kingdom of Romania in June 1920 under the terms of the Treaty of Trianon, and fell within plasa Târgu Mureș in Mureș County during the interwar period. In August 1940, under the auspices of Nazi Germany, which imposed the Second Vienna Award, Hungary retook the territory of Northern Transylvania from Romania, and the villages became part again of Maros-Torda County. Towards the end of World War II, however, the area was taken back from Hungarian and German troops by Romanian and Soviet forces in September–October 1944. Between 1952 and 1960, the commune fell within the Magyar Autonomous Region, and between 1960 and 1968 the Mureș-Magyar Autonomous Region. In 1968, the region was abolished when a new administrative law was adopted, and the area became part of Mureș County.

== Demographics ==
In 1910, the two current component villages were inhabited by 963 Hungarians (82.87%), 103 Romanians (8.86%) and 91 Roma (7.83%). In 1930, the census indicated 1,107 Hungarians (85.75%), 164 Romanians (12.70%), and 17 Roma (1.32%). At the 2011 census, the commune had population of 2,785, composed as follows: 66.5% Hungarians, 30% Romanians, and 3.2% Roma. At the 2021 census, Corunca the population had increased to 4,407, of which 45.54% were Hungarians, 41.5% Romanians, and 1.2% Roma.

Historical population
Year	1850	1880	1900	1910	1930	1956	1977	1992	2002	2011	2021
Pop.	927	911	1,223	1,162	1,291	1,562	1,918	1,627	1,743	2,785	4,407
±%	—	−1.7%	+34.2%	−5.0%	+11.1%	+21.0%	+22.8%	−15.2%	+7.1%	+59.8%	+58.2%

== See also ==
- List of Hungarian exonyms (Mureș County)
