= Țibucani =

- Commune
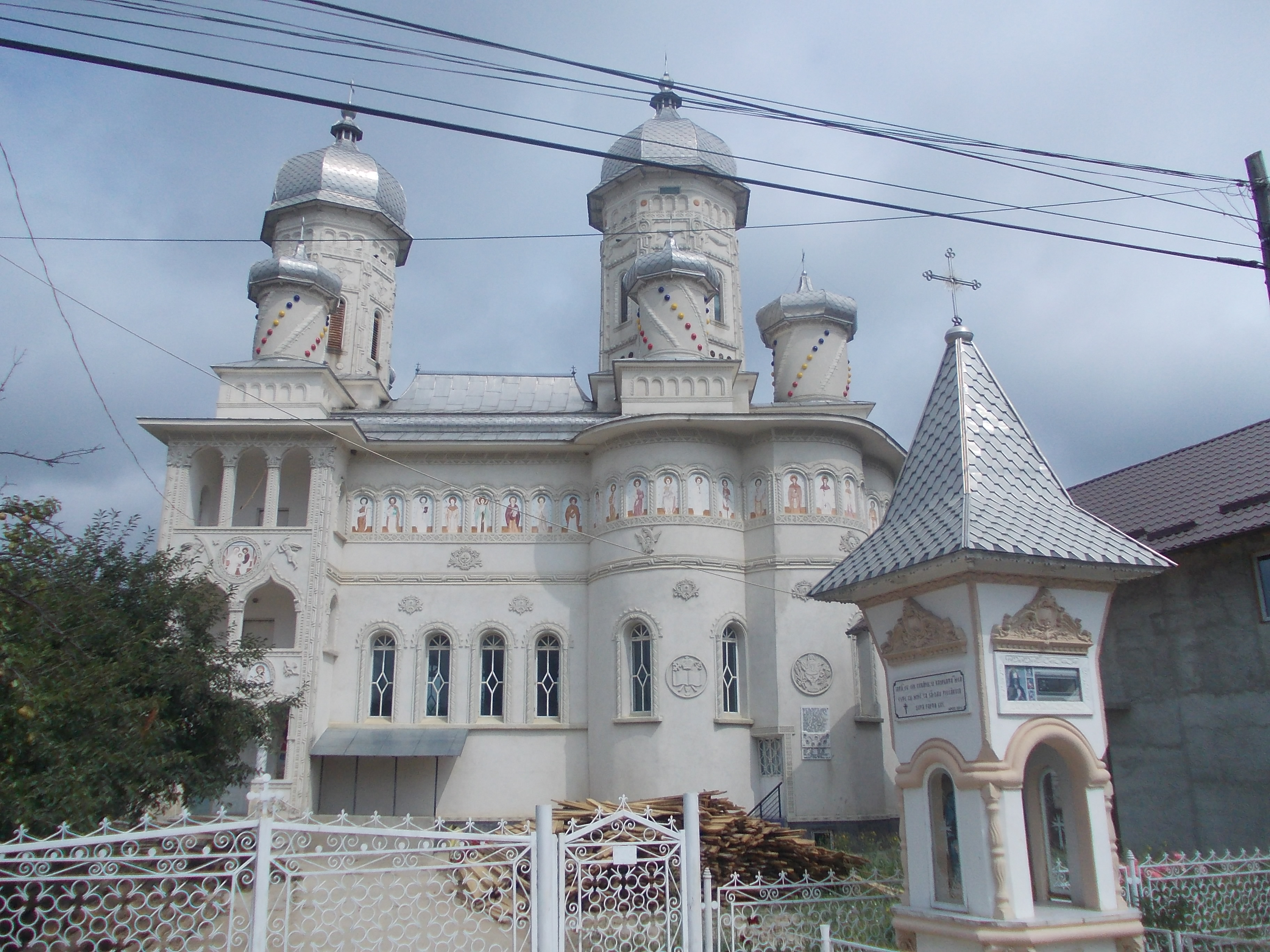
- Church of the Nativity of the Theotokos in Țibucani

- Location in Neamț County

- Location in Romania
- Coordinates: 47°07′04″N 26°33′38″E
- Country: Romania
- County: Neamț

Government
  - Mayor (2020–2024): Ioan Rusu (PSD)
- Area: 49.7 km^{2} (19.2 sq mi)
- Elevation: 328 m (1,076 ft)
- Population (2021-12-01): 3,508
  - Density: 70.6/km^{2} (183/sq mi)
- Time zone: UTC+02:00 (EET)
  - Summer (DST): UTC+03:00 (EEST)
- Postal code: 617480
- Area code: +(40) 233
- Vehicle reg.: NT
- Website: www.primaria-tibucani.ro

Țibucani is a commune in Neamț County, Western Moldavia, Romania. It is composed of three villages: Davideni, Țibucani, and Țibucanii de Jos.

The commune is situated on the Moldavian Plateau, at an altitude of 328 m (1,076 ft), on the banks of the river Umbrari. It is located in the northeastern part of the county, 32 km (20 mi) from the county seat, Piatra Neamț, on the border with Iași County.

Historical population
Year	Pop.	±%
1992	4,575	—
2002	4,459	−2.5%
2011	3,886	−12.9%
2021	3,508	−9.7%
Source: Census data
