= Valea Rea (Tecucel) =

- Location within Romania

Location
- Country: Romania
- Counties: Galați County
- Villages: Fântâni, Nicorești

Physical characteristics
- Mouth: Tecucel
  - coordinates: 45.9165°N 27.3221°E
- Length: 10 km (6.2 mi)
- Basin size: 16 km^{2} (6.2 sq mi)

Basin features
- Progression: Tecucel→ Bârlad→ Siret→ Danube→ Black Sea
- River code: XII.1.78.41.1

The Valea Rea is a right tributary of the river Tecucel in Romania. It flows into the Tecucel in Dobrinești. Its length is 10 km (6.2 mi) and its basin size is 16 km^{2} (6.2 sq mi).
