= Certeze =

- Commune

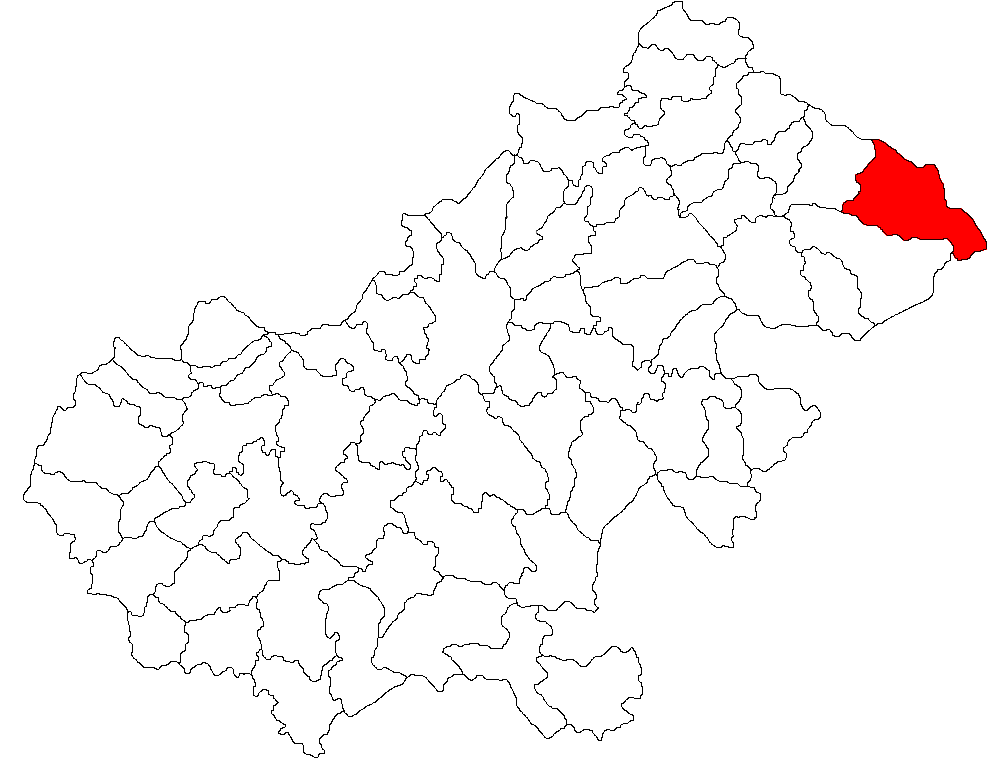
- Location in Satu Mare County

- Location in Romania
- Coordinates: 47°54′N 23°28′E
- Country: Romania
- County: Satu Mare

Government
  - Mayor (2020–2024): Petru Ciocan (PNL)
- Area: 101.41 km^{2} (39.15 sq mi)
- Elevation: 245 m (804 ft)
- Population (2021-12-01): 5,646
  - Density: 55.67/km^{2} (144.2/sq mi)
- Time zone: UTC+02:00 (EET)
  - Summer (DST): UTC+03:00 (EEST)
- Postal code: 447100
- Area code: +40 x59
- Vehicle reg.: SM
- Website: www.primaria-certeze.ro

Certeze (German: Neudorf; Hungarian: Avasújfalu, Hungarian pronunciation: [ˈɒvɒʃuːjfɒlu]) is a commune of 5,646 inhabitants situated in Satu Mare County, Romania. It is composed of three villages: Certeze, Huta-Certeze (Lajosvölgy), and Moișeni (Mózesfalu).

The commune is located in the Țara Oașului ethnographic and historical region, in the northeastern part of Satu Mare County. It lies on the banks of the river Valea Rea and its tributary, the Valea Albă.

Certeze is situated 55 km (34 mi) northeast of the county seat, Satu Mare, on the border with Ukraine. It is crossed by national road DN19, which starts in Oradea, goes through Satu Mare, and ends in Sighetu Marmației, in the neighboring Maramureș County.

== History ==
The town of Huta-Certeze (Ľudovítove údolie, in Slovak) was founded in the 19th century, in the Oaş Country, when Slovak and Polish settlers were brought to exploit the iron mines. The locality belongs to the commune of Certeze, Satu Mare County. It was established with the help of the mining engineer and former secretary of the Minister of Trade, Lajos Kovács, and the statesman Széchenyi István. They recruited miners and steel specialists from different mining and steel areas, whom they placed on Lajos Kovács's estate. The areas of origin were Zemplin, Spiš, Gemer, Borsod, Zvolen, Abaúj-Torna and Galicia-Poland. The miners were Roman Catholic. The settlement worked between 1851 and 1854.

== Religious particularities ==
=== Huta-Certeze Roman Catholic parish ===
Michael Haas, bishop of Satu Mare, decided to send a priest to Huta-Certeze who, in addition to parish duties, also had the obligation to ensure confessional education. Bishop Haas undertook to renovate and equip the parish house, in the same building the chapel, the parish house and the confessional school began to function. The building was consecrated by the bishop on November 29, 1863, the parishioners contributing over 700 days of work to the arrangement of the parish.

In 1877, the parish of Huta-Certeze is provisionally placed under the administration of the Parish of Iojib. Due to the lack of financial resources, the restoration of the parish was not successful for several decades.

With the support of the new bishop of Satu Mare, Tibor Boromissza, in 1913 the parish resumed its activity. The parish house was then built between 1913-1915. Due to the outbreak of the war, the construction of the church was not completed and as a result the plan of the parish house was changed, in which the church and the chapel were arranged.

During the time of parish priest Károly Barna, the current one-story parish house was built with the help of Catholic organizations from abroad. It was completed in 1980.

The old building where the chapel was modified, the former parish priest's rooms being annexed to the chapel, at the same time raising the height of the walls. Thus the chapel became much more spacious.

In 1993, the construction of the new church began, under the direction of parish priest László Fagea. The completed church was consecrated on August 14, 2010 by Bishop Jenő Schönberger. The temple of the church is Saint John Nepomuk. If in 1864 there were 208 parishioners in Huta-Certeze, in 2012 their number had increased to 841.

== Demographics ==
Ethnic composition
1. Romanians (94.7%)
2. Other (0.35%)
3. Unknown (4.92%)
Religious composition
1. Orthodox (72.9%)
2. Roman Catholic (14.6%)
3. Jehovah’s Witnesses (4.87%)
4. Other (2.53%)
5. Unknown (5.07%)

According to the 2021 Population and Housing Census, the population of Certeze commune amounts to 5,646 inhabitants, increasing compared to the previous census of 2011, when 5,636 inhabitants had been registered. Most of the inhabitants are Romanian (94.72%), and for 4.92% the ethnicity is unknown. From a religious point of view, the majority of the inhabitants are Orthodox (72.94%), with minorities of Roman Catholics (14.59%) and Jehovah's Witnesses (4.87%), and for 5.07% it is unknown religious affiliation.

=== Local Slovak community ===
The state school with teaching in the Slovak language opened in September 1938, in two of the rooms of the parish house. In the fall of 1939, as a result of military mobilization and concentration, the Romanian army seized the parish house, with the aim of quartering the military. Thus, the teaching in the Slovak language in the chapel was provisionally approved. During the Hungarian rule over Northern Transylvania between 1940-1944, the school was in the Hungarian language, according to many elders from the village who went to school during that period.

In 1999, optional education in the Slovak language was organized at the local school, which operated until 2001.

Slovaks from Huta Certeze participate in actions organized by the Democratic Union of Slovaks and Czechs of Romania, such as the annual visit to the Roman Catholic Basilica in Radna or the children's participation in actions dedicated to June 1.

=== Anthropology ===
Starting with the 1970s, the local population started a competitional chase after money and wealth. This derived from their main occupation for centuries, that being raising sheep which represents profitable business even as of today. Starting with the late 1990s, the locals began an eventual exodus towards various European countries (with main destination being France) in order to invest the money they earned at home. The fame of the commune is brought by the houses built with the money obtained especially from abroad. One-story, two-story and even three-story houses with wooden attics, tile or tin roofs, with stone foundations or pillars, modern windows or carved wooden doors, balconies with unusual architecture and concrete or wrought iron fences, all built in modern and refined styles.

=== Politics and administration ===
Certeze commune is administered by a mayor and a local council composed of 15 councillors. The mayor, Petru Ciocan, from the National Liberal Party (PNL), has been in office since 2008. Starting with the local elections in 2020, the local council has the following composition by political parties:
