= Talna Mică =

- Location within Romania

Location
- Country: Romania
- Counties: Satu Mare County

Physical characteristics
- Source: Oaș Mountains
- Mouth: Talna
  - location: Vama
  - coordinates: 47.8384°N 23.3962°E
- Length: 11 km (6.8 mi)
- Basin size: 33 km^{2} (13 sq mi)

Basin features
- Progression: Talna→ Tur→ Tisza→ Danube→ Black Sea

The Talna Mică is a left tributary of the river Talna in Romania. It flows into the Talna in Vama. Its length is 11 km (6.8 mi) and its basin size is 33 km^{2} (13 sq mi).
