= Sâncraiu de Mureș =

Sâncraiu de Mureș Marosszentkirály
- Commune
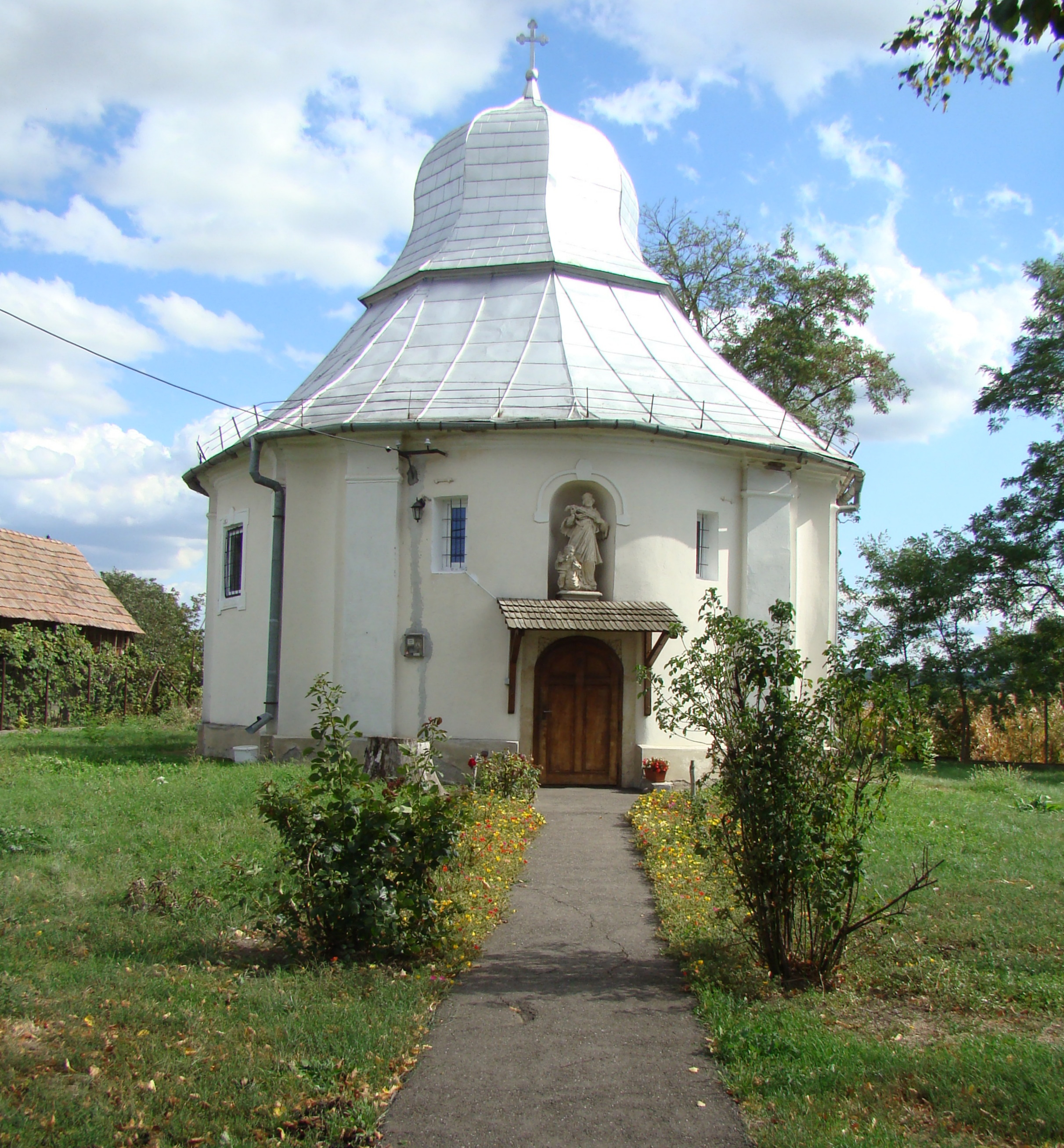
- Roman Catholic church in Sâncraiu de Mureș

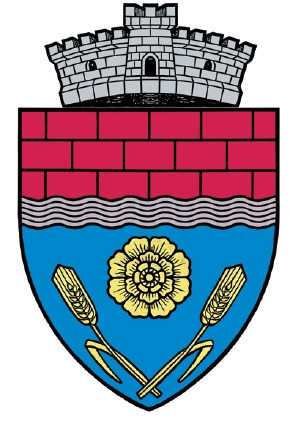
- Coat of arms

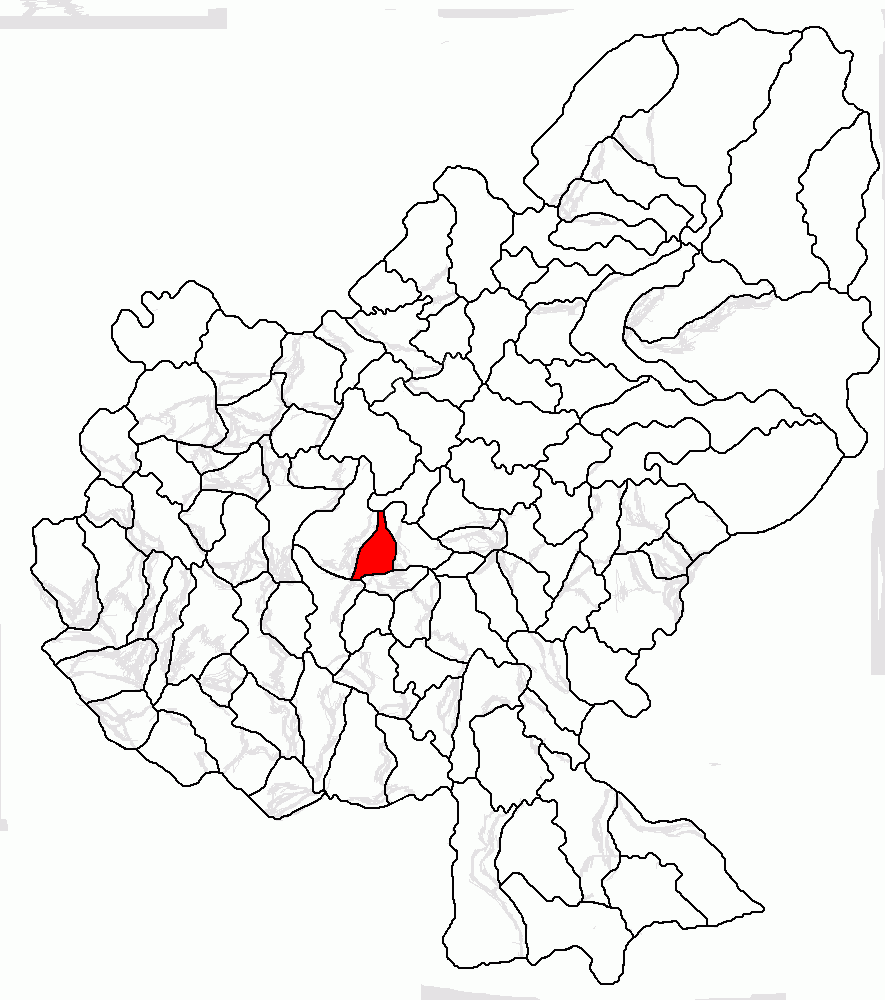
- Location in Mureș County

- Location in Romania
- Coordinates: 46.55°N 24.52°E
- Country: Romania
- County: Mureș

Government
  - Mayor (2020–2024): Petru Ionuț Budian (PNL)
- Area: 20.57 km^{2} (7.94 sq mi)
- Elevation: 309 m (1,014 ft)
- Population (2021-12-01): 10,403
  - Density: 505.7/km^{2} (1,310/sq mi)
- Time zone: UTC+02:00 (EET)
  - Summer (DST): UTC+03:00 (EEST)
- Postal code: 547525
- Area code: (+40) 0265
- Vehicle reg.: MS
- Website: sancraiums.ro

Sâncraiu de Mureș (Hungarian: Marosszentkirály, Hungarian pronunciation: [ˈmɒrossɛntkiraːj] meaning "Holy King on the Mureș River") is a commune in Mureș County, Transylvania, Romania composed of two villages: Nazna (Náznánfalva) and Sâncraiu de Mureș. Around 1930, Cornățel (Egerszeg) village was merged into Sâncraiu de Mureș.

The commune is situated on the Transylvanian Plateau, on the right bank of the Mureș River. It is located in the central part of Mureș County, just west of the county seat, Târgu Mureș, and belongs to the Târgu Mureș metropolitan area.

== Demographics ==
According to the 2011 census, the commune had a population of 7,489, of which 62.37% were Romanians, 30.1% were Székely Hungarians, and 4.17% Roma. At the 2021 census, Sâncraiu de Mureș had a population of 10,403, of which 67.46% were Romanians, 21.2% Hungarians, and 2.2% Roma.

== See also ==
- List of Hungarian exonyms (Mureș County)
