= Bixad, Satu Mare =

Bixad
- Commune
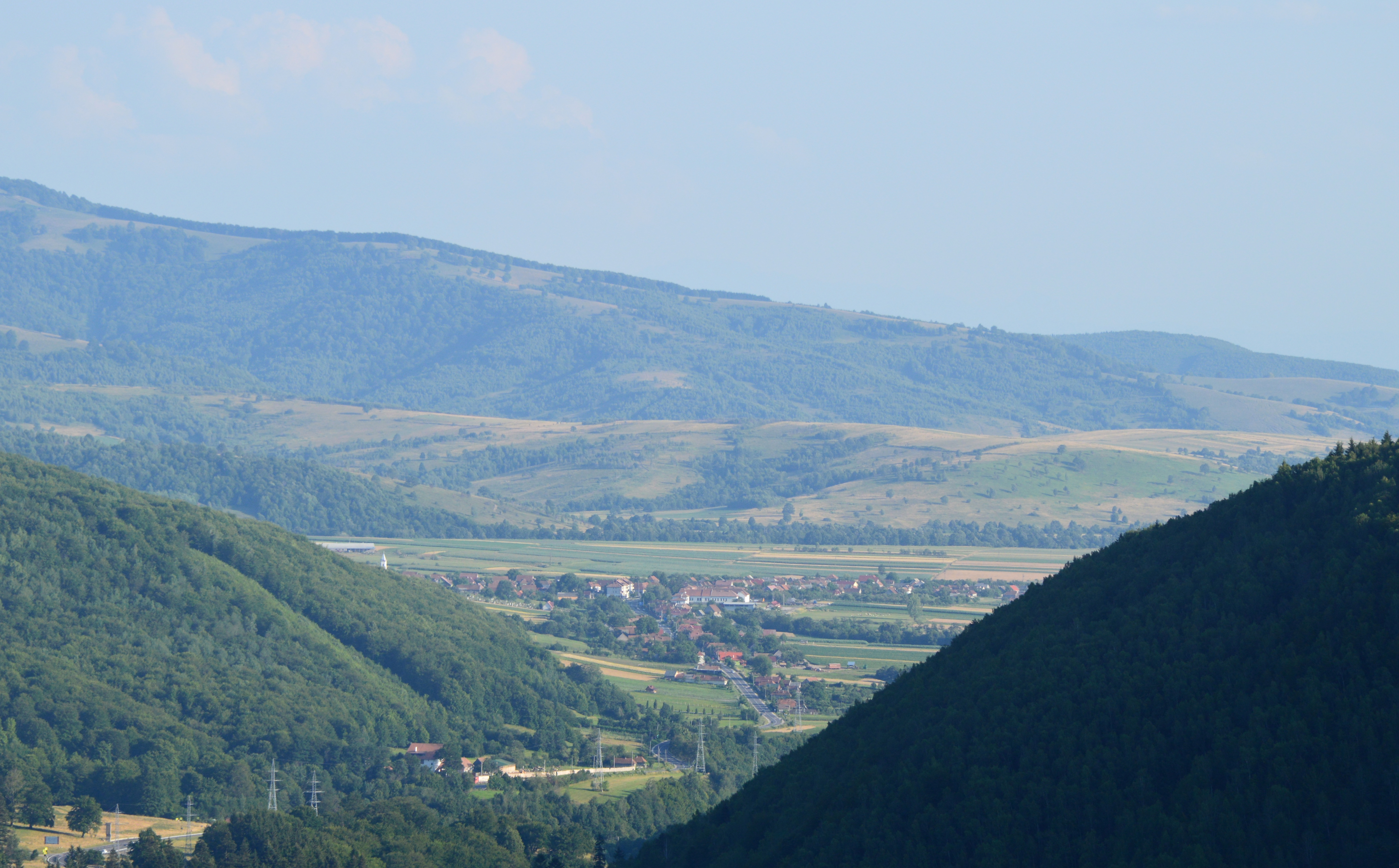

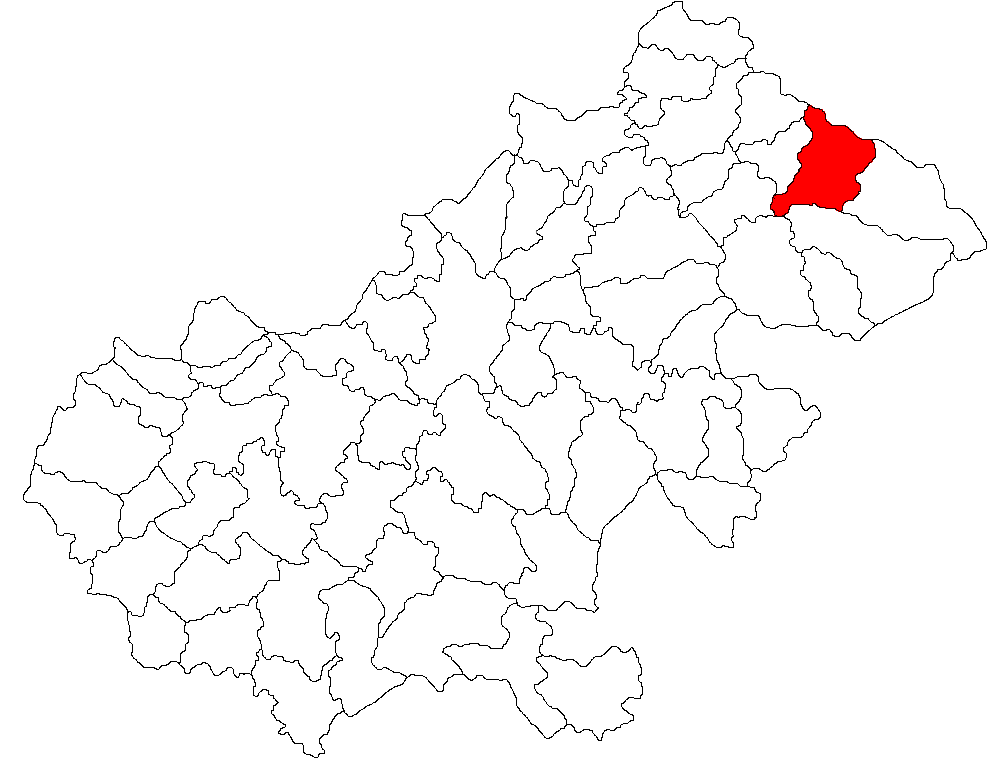
- Location in Satu Mare County

- Location in Romania
- Coordinates: 47°56′N 23°26′E
- Country: Romania
- County: Satu Mare

Government
  - Mayor (2020–2024): Ioan Tătar (PNL)
- Area: 77.33 km^{2} (29.86 sq mi)
- Elevation: 195 m (640 ft)
- Population (2021-12-01): 6,368
  - Density: 82.35/km^{2} (213.3/sq mi)
- Time zone: UTC+02:00 (EET)
  - Summer (DST): UTC+03:00 (EEST)
- Postal code: 447055
- Area code: (+40) 02 61
- Vehicle reg.: SM
- Website: www.primaria-bixad.ro

Bixad (Hungarian: Bikszád, pronounced: [ˈbiksaːd]) is a commune of 6,368 inhabitants situated in Satu Mare County, Romania. It is composed of three villages: Bixad, Boinești (Bujánháza), and Trip (Terep).

The commune is located in the Țara Oașului ethnographic and historical region, in the northern part of Satu Mare County. It lies on the banks of the river Valea Rea and its tributary, the Valea Albă.

Bixad is situated 50 km (31 mi) northeast of the county seat, Satu Mare, on the border with Ukraine. The Bixad train station serves the CFR Line 417, which connects it to Satu Mare.
