= Sângeorgiu de Mureș =

Sângeorgiu de Mureș Marosszentgyörgy
- Commune
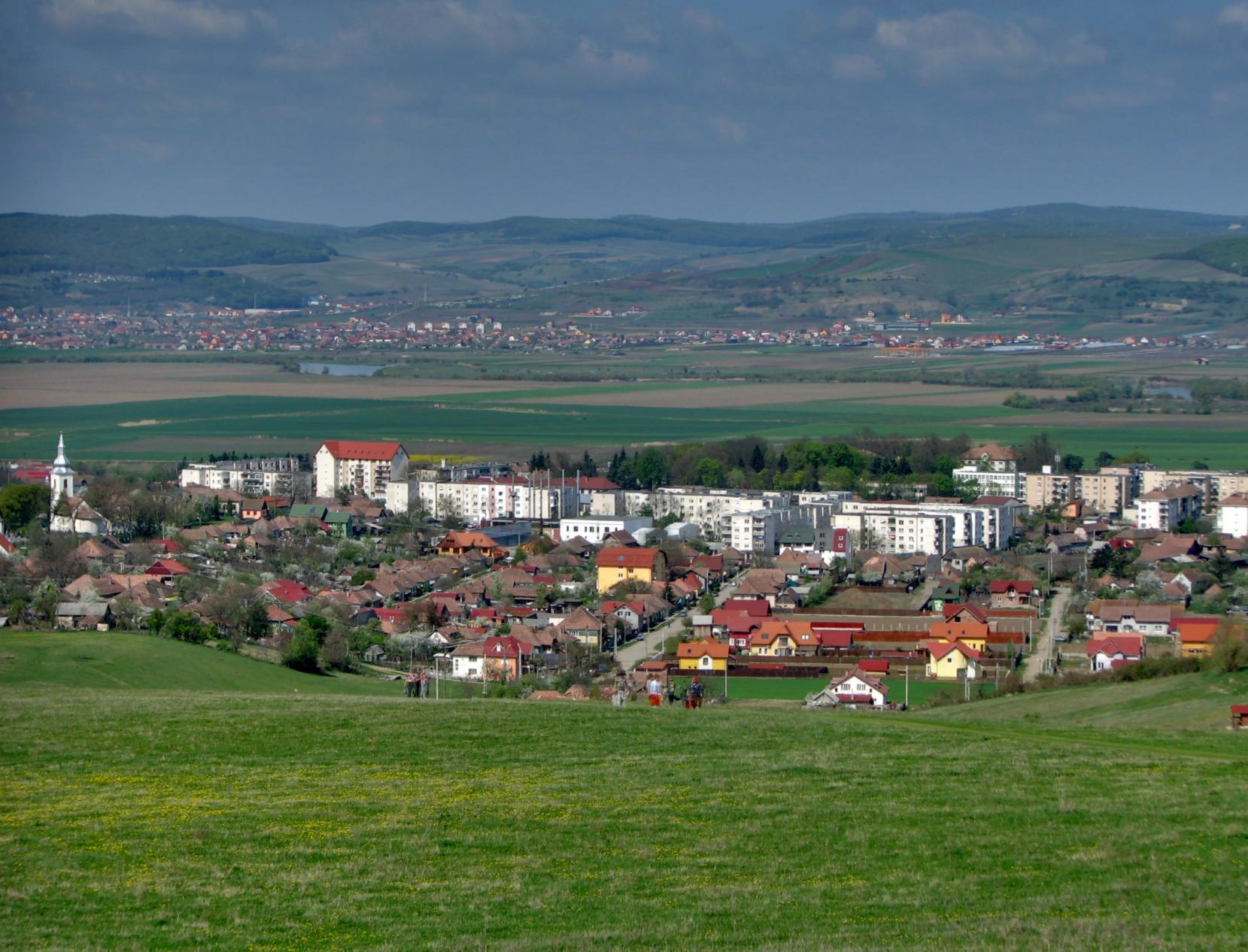
- Aerial view of Sângeorgiu de Mureș

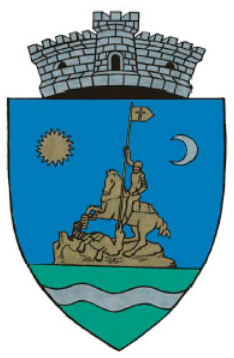
- Coat of arms

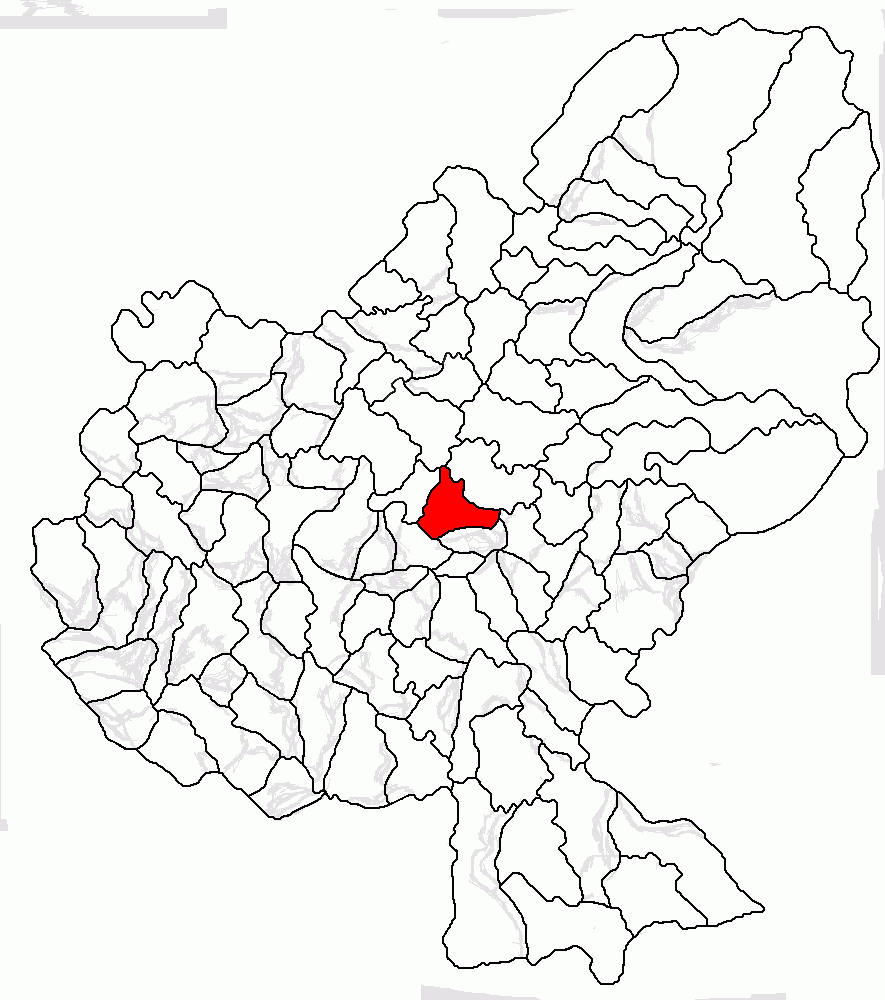
- Location in Mureș County

- Location in Romania
- Coordinates: 46°33′N 24°28′E
- Country: Romania
- County: Mureș

Government
  - Mayor (2020–2024): Sándor-Szabolcs Sófalvi (UDMR)
- Area: 28.96 km^{2} (11.18 sq mi)
- Elevation: 350 m (1,150 ft)
- Population (2021-12-01): 9,688
  - Density: 334.5/km^{2} (866.4/sq mi)
- Time zone: UTC+02:00 (EET)
  - Summer (DST): UTC+03:00 (EEST)
- Postal code: 547530
- Area code: (+40) 02 65
- Vehicle reg.: MS
- Website: singeorgiudemures.eu

Sângeorgiu de Mureș (Hungarian: Marosszentgyörgy [ˈmɒroʃsɛɲɟørɟ]) is a commune in Mureș County, Transylvania, Romania composed of three villages: Cotuș (Csejd), Sângeorgiu de Mureș, and Tofalău (Tófalva).

== Geography ==
The commune is situated on the Transylvanian Plateau, on the left bank of the Mureș River. It is located in the central part of the county, 7 km (4.3 mi) northeast of the county seat, Târgu Mureș, on national road DN15. It forms part of the Târgu Mureș metropolitan area.

== Demographics ==
Historical population
Year	Pop.	±%
1850	1,551	—
1930	2,625	+69.2%
1966	5,118	+95.0%
2002	7,892	+54.2%
2011	9,304	+17.9%
2021	9,688	+4.1%
Source: Census data

The commune has a Hungarian majority. According to the 2011 census, it had a population of 9,304, of which 50.31% were Hungarians, 36.92% Romanians, and 7.94% Roma. At the 2021 census, Sângeorgiu de Mureș had 9,688 inhabitants; of those, 42.19% were Hungarians, 33.61% Romanians, and 1.85% Roma.

== See also ==
- List of Hungarian exonyms (Mureș County)
