= Batar (river) =

Batar Batár

Location
- Countries: Ukraine; Hungary
- Oblast: Zakarpattia
- County: Szabolcs-Szatmár-Bereg

Physical characteristics
- Mouth: Tisza
  - coordinates: 48°5′50″N 22°49′40″E
- Length: 53 km (33 mi)
- Basin size: 393 km^{2} (152 sq mi)

Basin features
- Progression: Tisza→ Danube→ Black Sea
- Tributaries
  - left: Bătarci, Egher

The Batar (Ukrainian: Батар; Hungarian: Batár) is a river in Ukraine and Hungary. It is a left tributary of the river Tisza, which it joins at Tiszabecs. Its source is near the village Cherna, about 10 kilometres (6 mi) east of Korolevo, in Vynohradiv Raion. It flows through the villages Cherna, Hudia, Kholmovets and Magosliget.
