= Frecăței, Tulcea =

Frecăței
- Commune
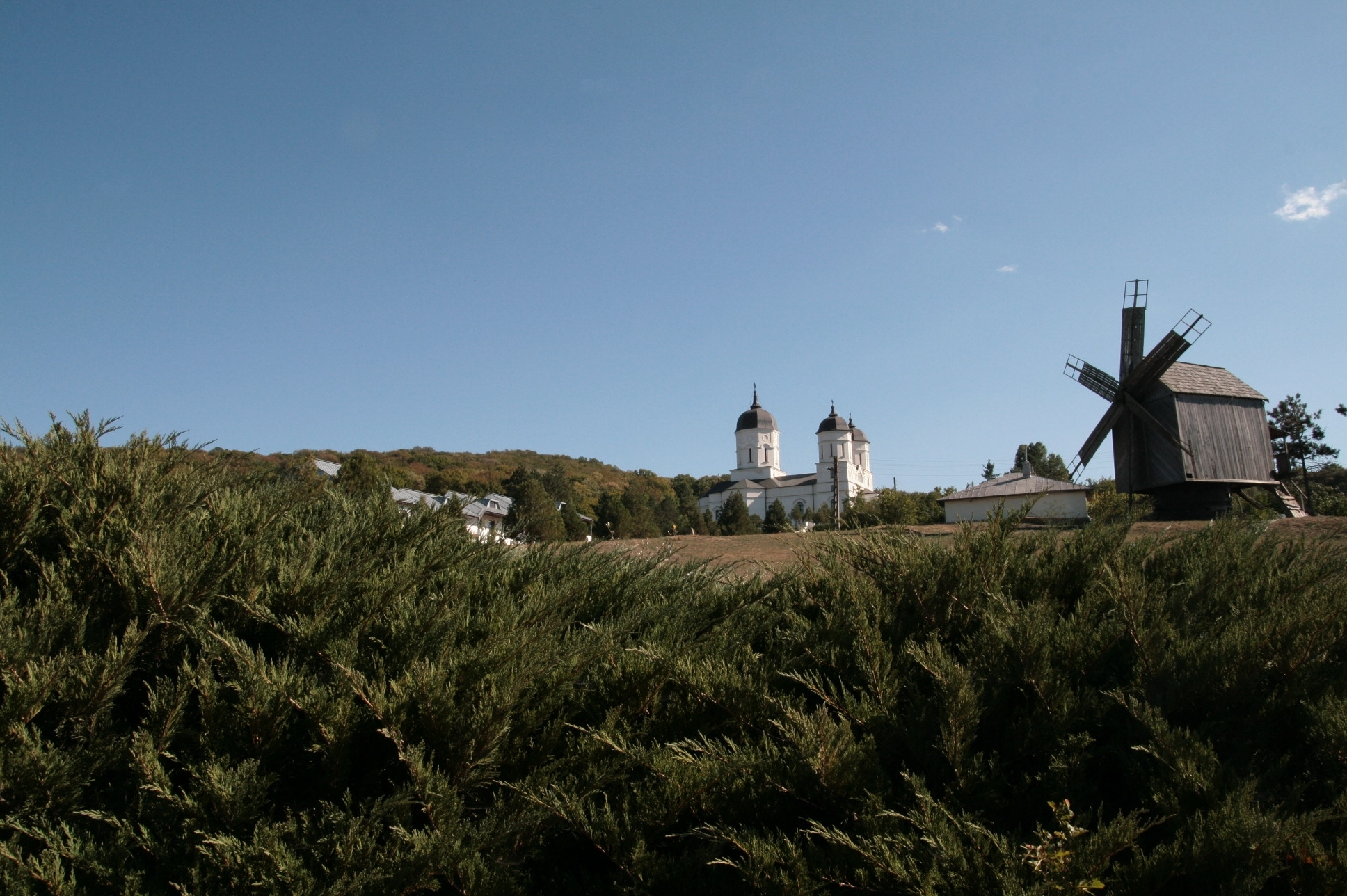
- Celic-Dere Monastery in Telița

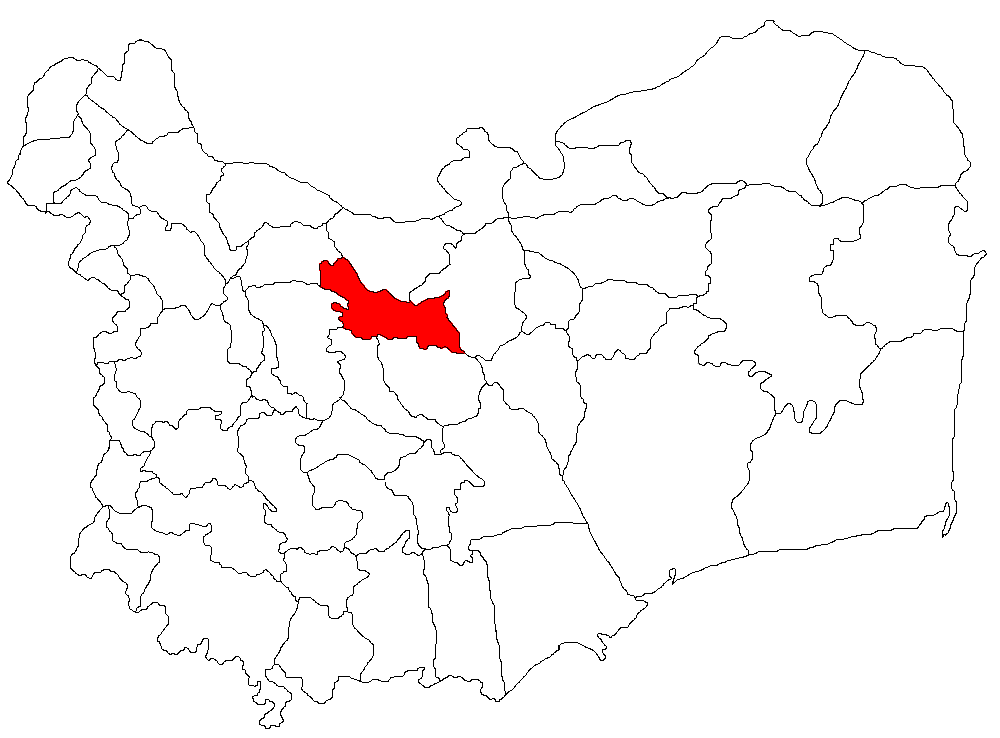
- Location in Tulcea County

- Location in Romania
- Coordinates: 45°06′N 28°40′E
- Country: Romania
- County: Tulcea
- Subdivisions: Cataloi, Frecăței, Poșta, Telița

Government
  - Mayor (2020–2024): Marian Naiman (PSD)
- Area: 48.29 km^{2} (18.64 sq mi)
- Population (2021-12-01): 3,415
  - Density: 70.72/km^{2} (183.2/sq mi)
- Time zone: UTC+02:00 (EET)
  - Summer (DST): UTC+03:00 (EEST)
- Postal code: 827075
- Vehicle reg.: TL
- Website: www.primariafrecatei.ro

Frecăței is a commune in Tulcea County, Northern Dobruja, Romania. It is composed of four villages: Cataloi, Frecăței, Poșta and Telița.
