= Valea Rea (Tur) =

- Location within Romania

Location
- Country: Romania
- Counties: Satu Mare County
- Villages: Huta-Certeze, Bixad

Physical characteristics
- Source: Oaș Mountains
- Mouth: Tur
  - location: Remetea Oașului
  - coordinates: 47.8840°N 23.3168°E
- Length: 29 km (18 mi)
- Basin size: 289 km^{2} (112 sq mi)

Basin features
- Progression: Tur→ Tisza→ Danube→ Black Sea
- Tributaries
  - left: Valea Albă
  - right: Cireș, Frasin, Lechincioara

The Valea Rea is a right tributary of the Tur in Romania. It discharges into the Tur between Boinești and Remetea Oașului. Its length is 29 km (18 mi) and its basin size is 289 km^{2} (112 sq mi). Its lower course is also considered the lower course of the Lechincioara.
