= Tișovița =

- Location within Romania

Location
- Country: Romania
- Counties: Mehedinți County
- Villages: Eibenthal

Physical characteristics
- Mouth: Danube
  - coordinates: 44.5182°N 22.1953°E
- Length: 16 km (9.9 mi)
- Basin size: 33 km^{2} (13 sq mi)

Basin features
- Progression: Danube→ Black Sea

The Tișovița is a small left tributary of the river Danube in Romania. It flows into the Danube near Eibenthal, between Dubova and Svinița. Its length is 16 km (9.9 mi) and its basin size is 33 km^{2} (13 sq mi).
