= Livezeni =

Livezeni Jedd
- Commune
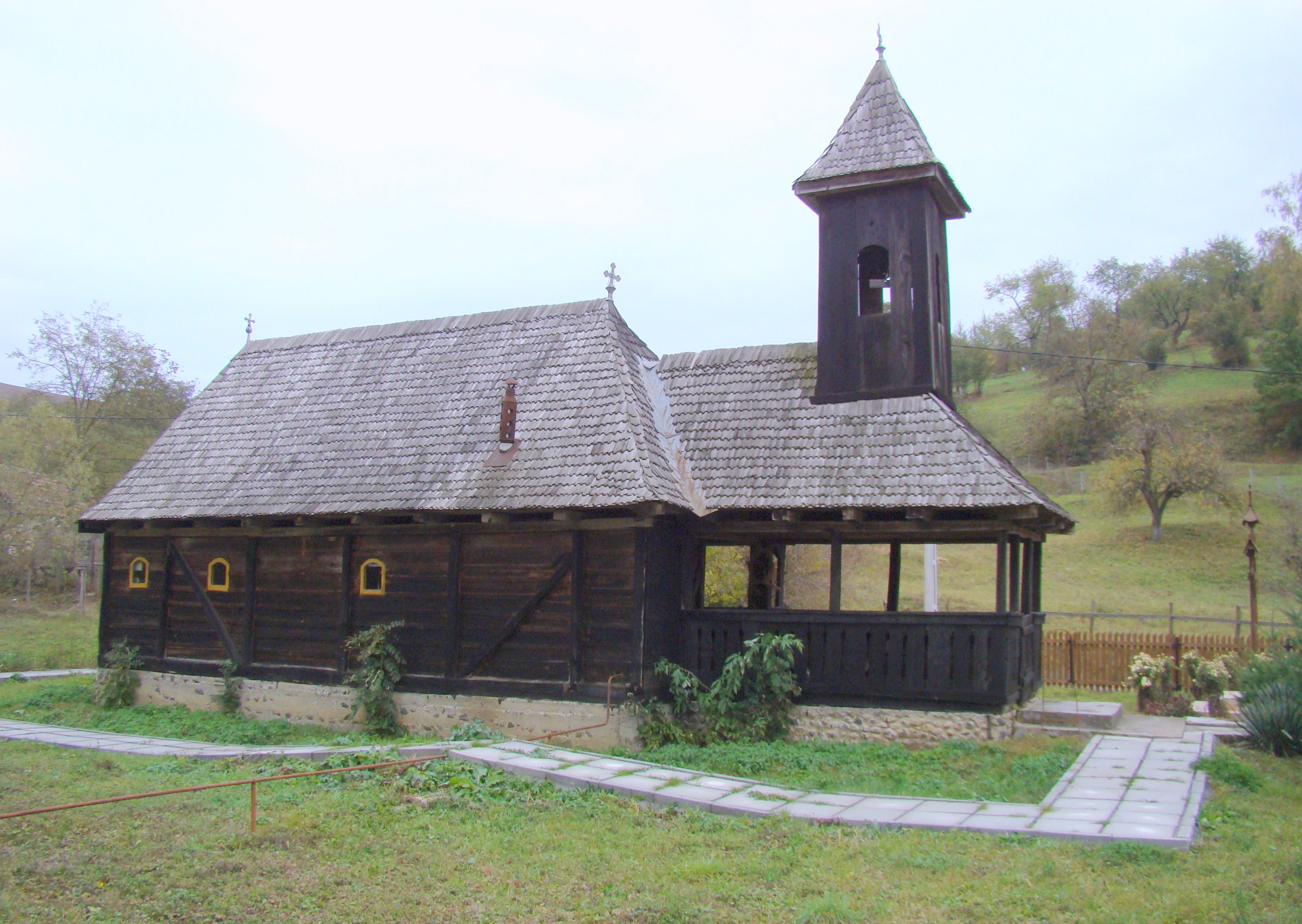
- Wooden church in Sânișor

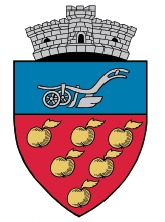
- Coat of arms

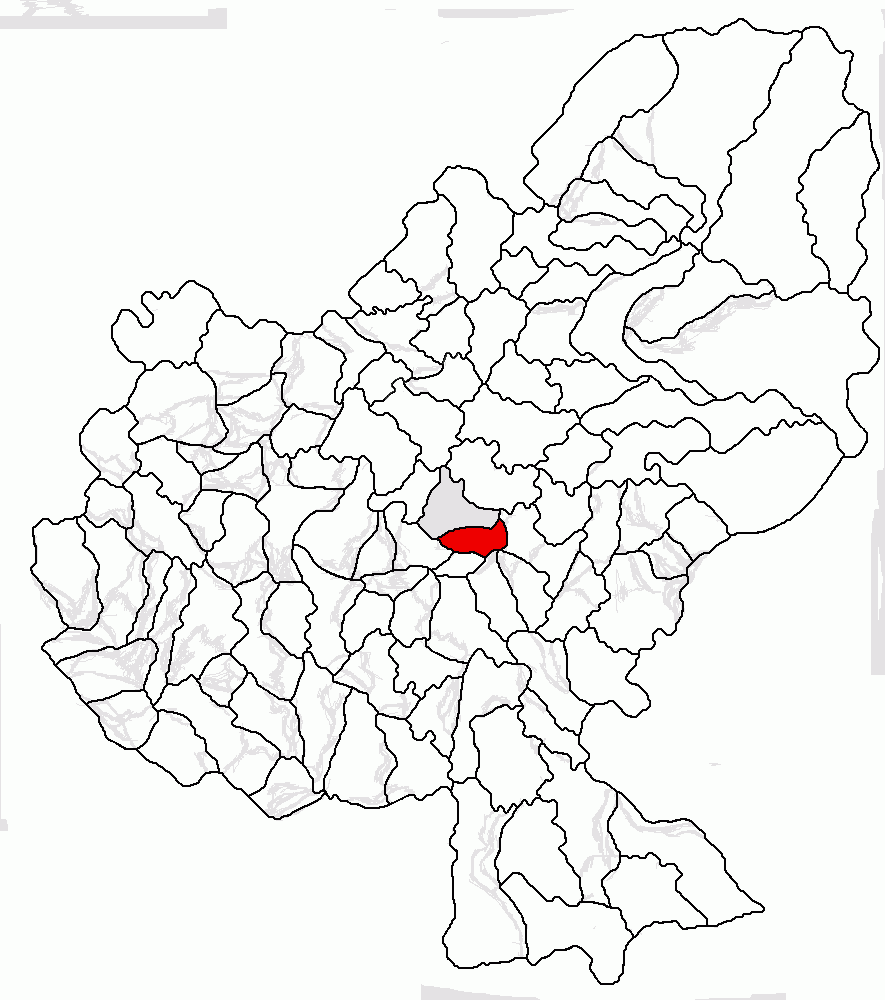
- Location in Mureș County

- Location in Romania
- Coordinates: 46°33′N 24°38′E
- Country: Romania
- County: Mureș

Government
  - Mayor (2020–2024): István Bányai (UDMR)
- Area: 25.12 km^{2} (9.70 sq mi)
- Elevation: 358 m (1,175 ft)
- Population (2021-12-01): 4,610
  - Density: 184/km^{2} (475/sq mi)
- Time zone: UTC+02:00 (EET)
  - Summer (DST): UTC+03:00 (EEST)
- Postal code: 547365
- Area code: (+40) 0265
- Vehicle reg.: MS
- Website: comunalivezeni.ro

Livezeni (Hungarian: Jedd, Hungarian pronunciation: [ˈjɛdː]) is a commune in Mureș County, Transylvania, Romania composed of four villages: Ivănești (Kebeleszentiván), Livezeni, Poienița (Marosagárd), and Sânișor (Kebele). In 2004, Corunca, along with the village of Bozeni, broke away from Livezeni to form an independent commune.

== History ==
The locality formed part of the Székely Land region of the historical Transylvania province. Until 1918, the villages belonged to the Háromszék County of the Kingdom of Hungary. In the aftermath of World War I, the Union of Transylvania with Romania was declared in December 1918. At the start of the Hungarian–Romanian War of 1918–1919, the locality passed under Romanian administration; it officially became part of the territory ceded to the Kingdom of Romania in June 1920 under the terms of the Treaty of Trianon.

== Demographics ==
According to the 2002 census, the commune had a population of 2,032. According to the 2011 census, the population increased to 3,266; of those, 50.21% were Hungarians, 30.86% Romanians, and 15,62% Roma, while 3% did not declare an ethnicity. At the 2021 census, Livezeni had a population of 4,610, of which 40.24% were Hungarians, 37.92% Romanians, and 14,38% Roma.

== See also ==
- List of Hungarian exonyms (Mureș County)
