= Ernei =

Ernei Nagyernye
- Commune
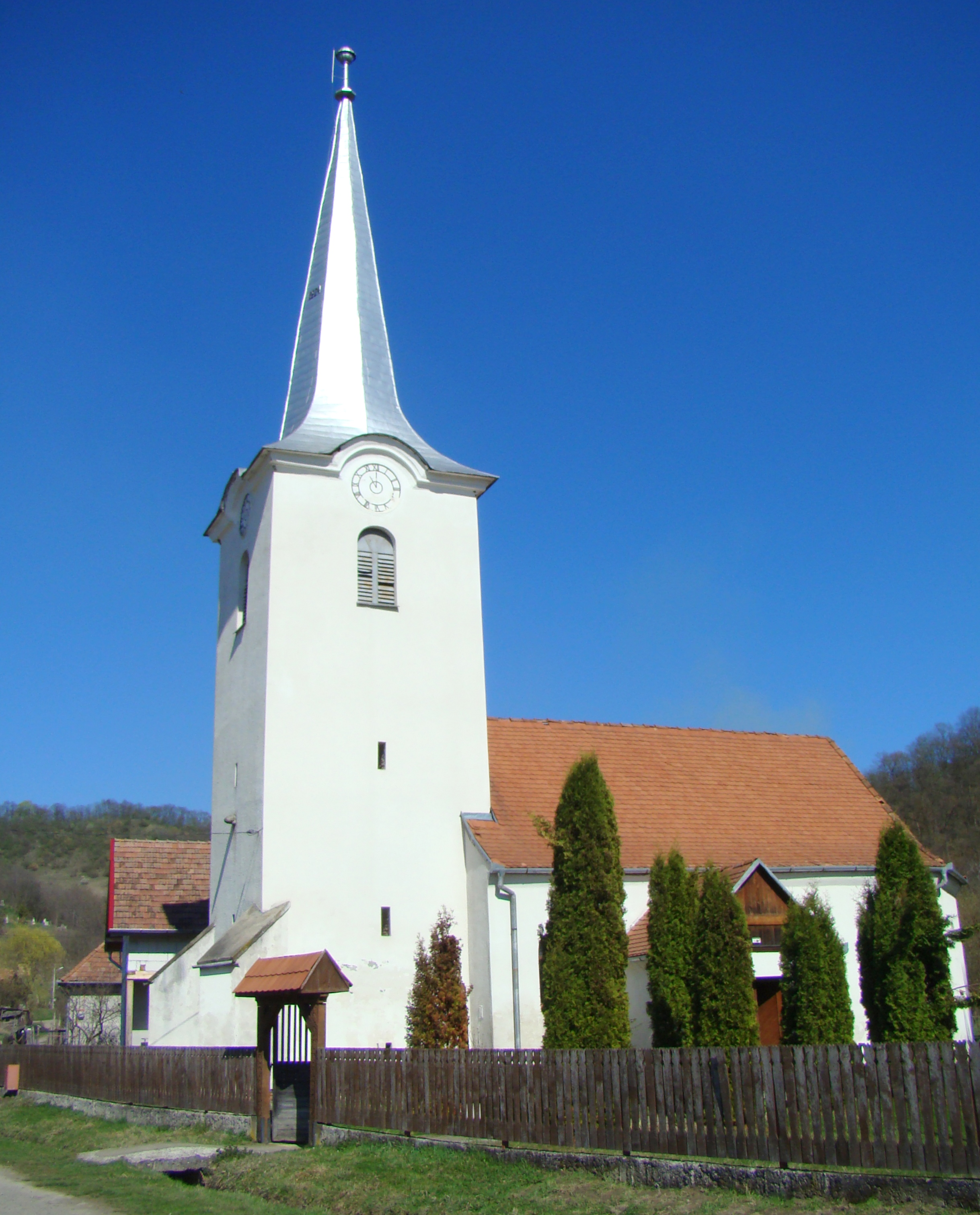
- Unitarian church in Călușeri

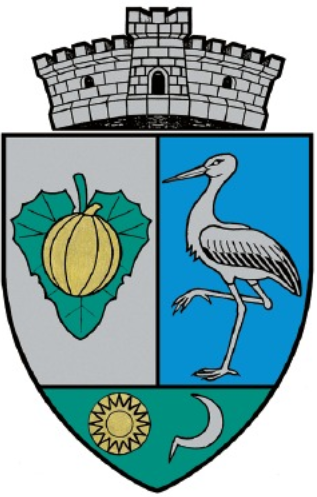
- Coat of arms

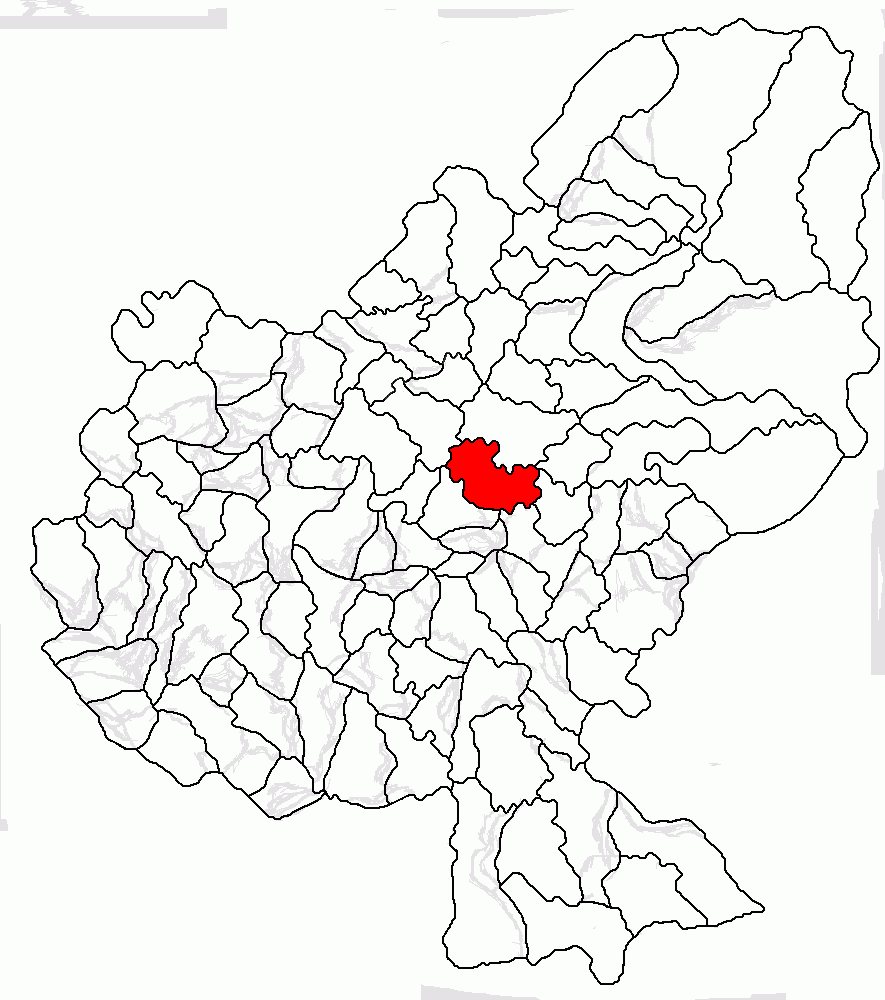
- Location in Mureș County

- Location in Romania
- Coordinates: 46°36′N 24°39′E
- Country: Romania
- County: Mureș

Government
  - Mayor (2020–2024): Ferenc Jánosi (UDMR)
- Area: 67.78 km^{2} (26.17 sq mi)
- Elevation: 334 m (1,096 ft)
- Population (2021-12-01): 5,843
  - Density: 86.21/km^{2} (223.3/sq mi)
- Time zone: UTC+02:00 (EET)
  - Summer (DST): UTC+03:00 (EEST)
- Postal code: 547215
- Area code: +40 x59
- Vehicle reg.: MS
- Website: primariaernei.ro

Ernei (Hungarian: Nagyernye [ˈnɒɟɛrɲɛ]) is a commune in Mureș County, Transylvania, Romania, composed of six villages: Călușeri (Székelykál), Dumbrăvioara (Sáromberke), Ernei, Icland (Ikland), Săcăreni (Székes), and Sângeru de Pădure (Erdőszengyel).

== Geography ==
The commune is situated on the Transylvanian Plateau, on the left bank of the Mureș River. It is located in the central part of the county, 11 km (6.8 mi) northeast of the county seat, Târgu Mureș, and forms part of the Târgu Mureș metropolitan area. Ernei is traversed by national road DN15, which connects Transylvania to Western Moldavia; the city of Reghin is 22 km (14 mi) to the north.

== History ==
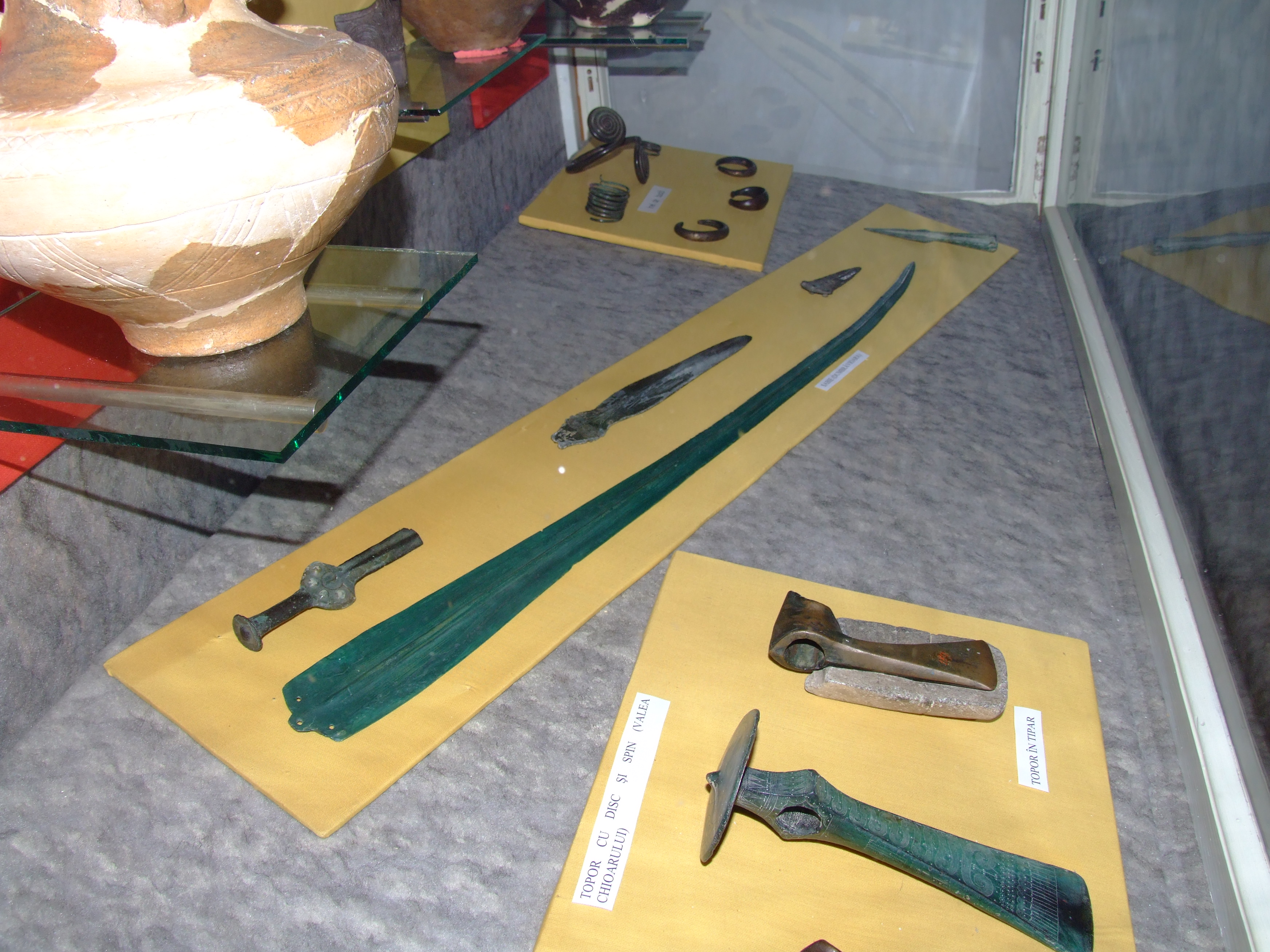
On the left, Mycenaean (3800–1200 BC) bronze sword found at Dumbrăvioara. In display at the National Museum of Transylvanian History, Cluj-Napoca

Ernei formed part of the Székely Land region of the historical Transylvania province. Until 1876, it fell within Marosszék, thereafter until 1918, the village belonged to the Maros-Torda County of the Kingdom of Hungary. After the Hungarian–Romanian War of 1918–19 and the Treaty of Trianon of 1920, it became part of the Kingdom of Romania. As a result of the Second Vienna Award, it belonged to Hungary again between 1940 and 1944. After World War II, it returned to Romanian administration. Between 1952 and 1960, it constituted part of the Magyar Autonomous Region, then, of the Mureș-Magyar Autonomous Region until it was abolished in 1968. Since then, the commune is part of Mureș County.

== Demographics ==
The commune has an absolute Székely Hungarian majority. According to the 2011 census, it has a population of 5,835, of which 73.42% were Hungarians, 16.33% Roma, and 7.75% Romanians. It reached its maximum population in 1966 with 6,014 people. At the 2021 census, Ernei had a population of 5,843; of those, 65.38% were Hungarians, 15.32% Roma, and 10.25% Romanians.

== Broadcasting transmitter ==
South of Ernei at 46°35'35"N 24°38'0"E, there is a mediumwave transmitter working on 1323 kHz with a power of 15 kW. This transmitter occasionally broadcasts sometimes in German language.

== Natives ==
- Elek Köblös (1887– 1938), communist activist, general secretary of the Romanian Communist Party from 1924 to 1927

== See also ==
- Prehistory of Transylvania
- Wietenberg culture
- Mycenae
- List of Hungarian exonyms (Mureș County)
