= Valea Rea (Tărățel) =

- Location within Romania

Location
- Country: Romania
- Counties: Gorj County

Physical characteristics
- Mouth: Tărățel
  - coordinates: 44.9879°N 23.4893°E
- Length: 10 km (6.2 mi)
- Basin size: 16 km^{2} (6.2 sq mi)

Basin features
- Progression: Tărățel→ Blahnița→ Gilort→ Jiu→ Danube→ Black Sea
- River code: VII.1.34.9.3.1

The Valea Rea is a left tributary of the Tărățel in Gorj County, Romania. It flows into the Tărățel in Pojogeni. Its length is 10 km (6.2 mi) and its basin size is 16 km^{2} (6.2 sq mi).
