= Turț (river) =

- Location within Romania

Location
- Country: Romania
- Counties: Satu Mare County
- Villages: Turț, Turulung

Physical characteristics
- Mouth: Tur
  - location: Turulung
  - coordinates: 47.9309°N 23.0917°E
- Length: 24 km (15 mi)
- Basin size: 95 km^{2} (37 sq mi)

Basin features
- Progression: Tur→ Tisza→ Danube→ Black Sea
- Tributaries
  - left: Șugatag

The Turț (Hungarian: Turc) is a right tributary of the river Tur in Romania. It discharges into the Tur in Turulung. Its length is 24 km (15 mi) and its basin size is 95 km^{2} (37 sq mi).
