= Tarna Mare =

- Commune
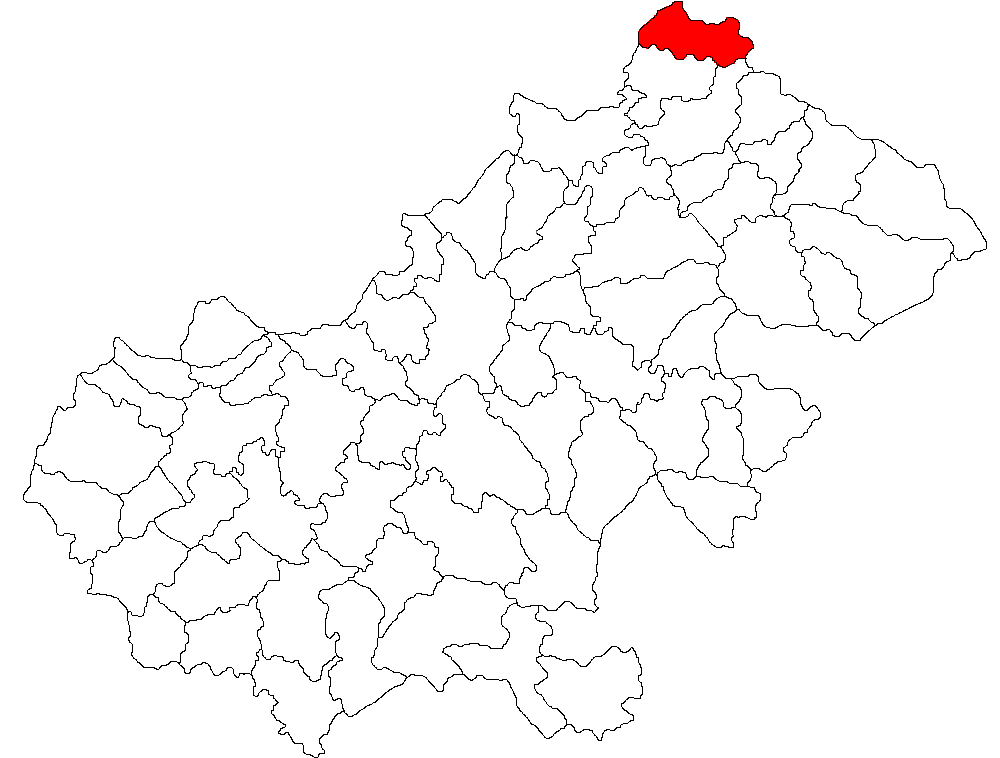
- Location in Satu Mare County

- Location in Romania
- Coordinates: 48°5′N 23°12′E
- Country: Romania
- County: Satu Mare

Government
  - Mayor (2020–2024): Mariana-Monica Sobius (PNL)
- Area: 44.05 km^{2} (17.01 sq mi)
- Elevation: 168 m (551 ft)
- Population (2021-12-01): 3,563
  - Density: 81/km^{2} (210/sq mi)
- Time zone: EET/EEST (UTC+2/+3)
- Postal code: 447310
- Area code: +(40) x59
- Vehicle reg.: SM
- Website: www.comunatarnamare.ro

Tarna Mare (Hungarian: Nagytarna; Hungarian pronunciation: [ˈnɒɟtɒrnɒ]) is a commune of 3,563 inhabitants situated in Satu Mare County, Romania. It is composed of four villages: Bocicău (Bocskó), Tarna Mare, Valea Seacă (Avaspatak), and Văgaș (Nagytarnafürdő).

Tarna Mare is situated in the Țara Oașului ethnocultural and historical region in the extreme north of Satu Mare County. It lies at an altitude of 168 m (551 ft), on the banks of the river Tarna Mare. The commune is located 54 km (34 mi) northeast of the county seat, Satu Mare, on the border with Ukraine.

At the 2021 census, the commune had a population of 3,563; of those, 81.17% were Romanians, 4.21% Ukrainians, 3.73% Roma, and 2.33% Hungarians.

Historical population
Year	Pop.	±%
2002	3,718	—
2011	3,774	+1.5%
2021	3,563	−5.6%
Source: INS, Census data
