= Umbrari =

- Location within Romania

Location
- Country: Romania
- Counties: Neamț, Iași
- Villages: Țibucani, Davideni

Physical characteristics
- Mouth: Moldova
  - location: Verșeni
  - coordinates: 47.1147°N 26.6329°E
- Length: 17 km (11 mi)
- Basin size: 34 km^{2} (13 sq mi)

Basin features
- Progression: Moldova→ Siret→ Danube→ Black Sea

The Umbrari is a right tributary of the river Moldova in Romania. It discharges into the Moldova near Verșeni. Its length is 17 km (11 mi) and its basin size is 34 km^{2} (13 sq mi).
