= Túrricse =

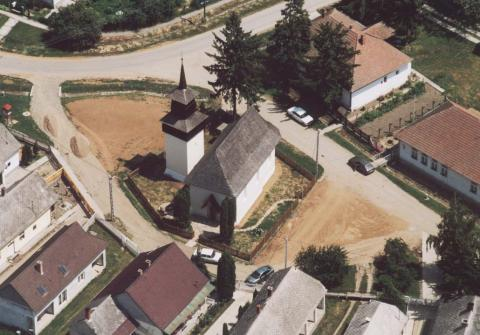
- The church from above

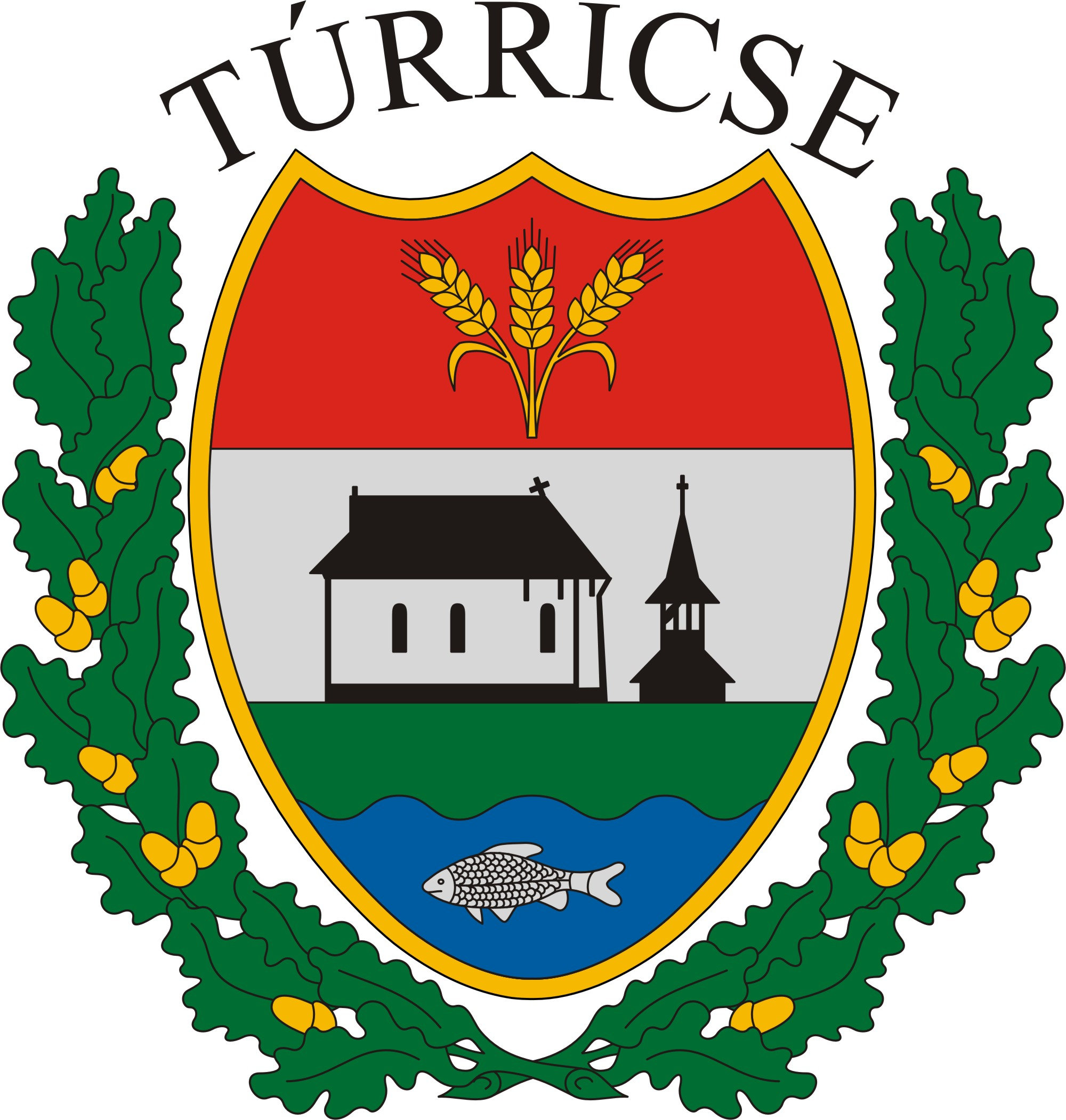
- Coat of arms

- Location of Túrricse in Hungary
- Coordinates: 47.97°N 22.77°E
- Country: Hungary
- Region: Northern Great Plain
- County: Szabolcs-Szatmár-Bereg

Area
  - Total: 12.99 km^{2} (5.02 sq mi)

Population (2015)
  - Total: 695
  - Density: 53.5/km^{2} (139/sq mi)
- Time zone: UTC+1 (CET)
  - Summer (DST): UTC+2 (CEST)
- Postal code: 4968
- Area code: +36 44

Túrricse is a village in Szabolcs-Szatmár-Bereg county, in the Northern Great Plain region of eastern Hungary. It is located in the eastern part of the county, about 10 kilometers from the Hungarian-Ukrainian-Romanian border.

== Geography ==
It covers an area of 12.99 km^{2} (5 sq mi) and has a population of 695 people (2015).

== History ==
The name of Túrricse (Ricse) was first mentioned in a charter as Riche in 1271, when King Stephen the Vth donated it to the ancestor of the Csáholyi family. It remained in the ownership of the family until 1611, when Péter Melith inherited the part of Csaholyi estate.

In the 18th century, Ricse was acquired by the Barkóczy family.

Szilárd Borbély's "Nincstelenek" is set in Túrricse.
