= Tărățel =

- Location within Romania

Location
- Country: Romania
- Counties: Gorj County

Physical characteristics
- Mouth: Blahnița
  - coordinates: 44.9740°N 23.4996°E
- Length: 14 km (8.7 mi)
- Basin size: 62 km^{2} (24 sq mi)

Basin features
- Progression: Blahnița→ Gilort→ Jiu→ Danube→ Black Sea
- Tributaries
  - right: Valea Rea

The Tărățel is a right tributary of the river Blahnița in Romania. It discharges into the Blahnița near the town Târgu Cărbunești. Its length is 14 km (8.7 mi) and its basin size is 62 km^{2} (24 sq mi).
