= Bătarci =

- Commune
- Coat of arms

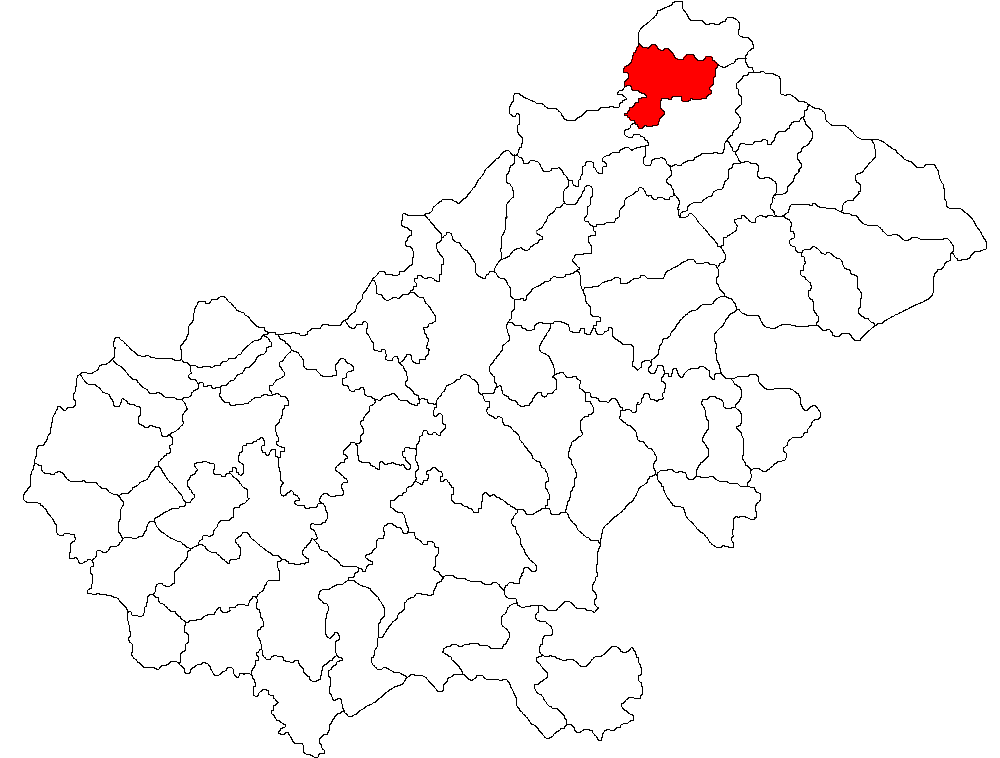
- Location in Satu Mare County

- Location in Romania
- Coordinates: 48°2′N 23°10′E
- Country: Romania
- County: Satu Mare

Government
  - Mayor (2020–2024): Vasile Adrian Toma (PNL)
- Area: 59.78 km^{2} (23.08 sq mi)
- Elevation: 150 m (490 ft)
- Population (2021-12-01): 3,612
  - Density: 60.42/km^{2} (156.5/sq mi)
- Time zone: UTC+02:00 (EET)
  - Summer (DST): UTC+03:00 (EEST)
- Postal code: 447030
- Area code: +40 x59
- Vehicle reg.: SM
- Website: primariabatarci.ro

Bătarci (Hungarian: Batarcs, Hungarian pronunciation: [ˈbɒtɒrtʃ], German: Batarsch) is a commune situated in Satu Mare County, Romania. It is composed of four villages: Bătarci, Comlăușa (Ugocsakomlós), Șirlău (Sellő), and Tămășeni (Tamásváralja).

The commune is located in the Țara Oașului ethnographic and historical region in the northern part of the county, on the border with Ukraine. It lies at an altitude of 150 m (490 ft), on the banks of the river Bătarci and its tributary, the river Tarna Mare.

== Demographics ==
At the 2021 census, the commune had a population of 3,612, of which 86.79% were Romanians and 9.16% Hungarians. In 2021, the percentage of males to females was 50.5% males and 49.5% females.

	2002	2011	2021	Percentage increase
Population consensus	3,741	3,707	3,612	-3.4%
