= Lazuri, Satu Mare =

Lazuri Lázári
- Commune
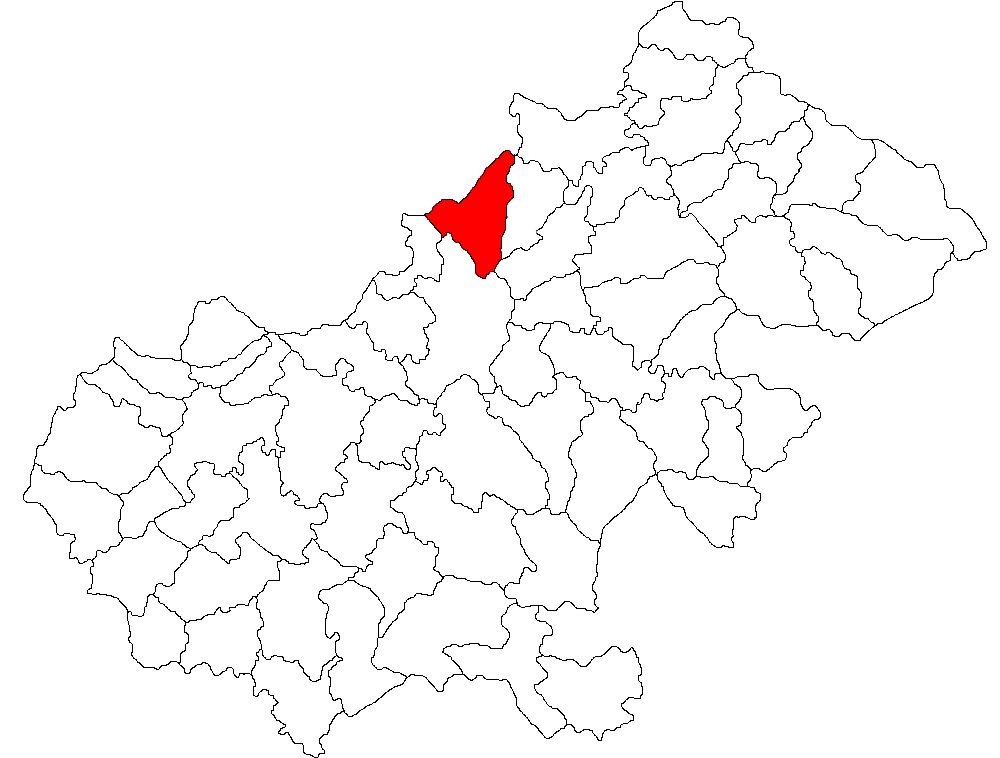
- Location in Satu Mare County

- Location in Romania
- Coordinates: 47°51′10″N 22°52′25″E
- Country: Romania
- County: Satu Mare
- Population (2021-12-01): 5,977
- Time zone: UTC+02:00 (EET)
  - Summer (DST): UTC+03:00 (EEST)
- Vehicle reg.: SM

Lazuri (Hungarian: Lázári, Hungarian pronunciation: [laːzaːri]) is a commune of 5,500 inhabitants situated in Satu Mare County, Romania. It is composed of six villages:

In Romanian	In Hungarian
Bercu	Szárazberek
Lazuri	Lázári
Nisipeni	Sándorhomok
Noroieni	Kissár
Peleș	Nagypeleske
Pelișor	Kispeleske

== Demographics ==
Ethnic groups (2002 census):

- Hungarians: 80.17%
- Romanians: 14.71%
- Romanies (Gypsies): 4.71%

According to mother tongue, 85.13% of the population speak Hungarian as their first language.
