= Nicorești =

- Commune
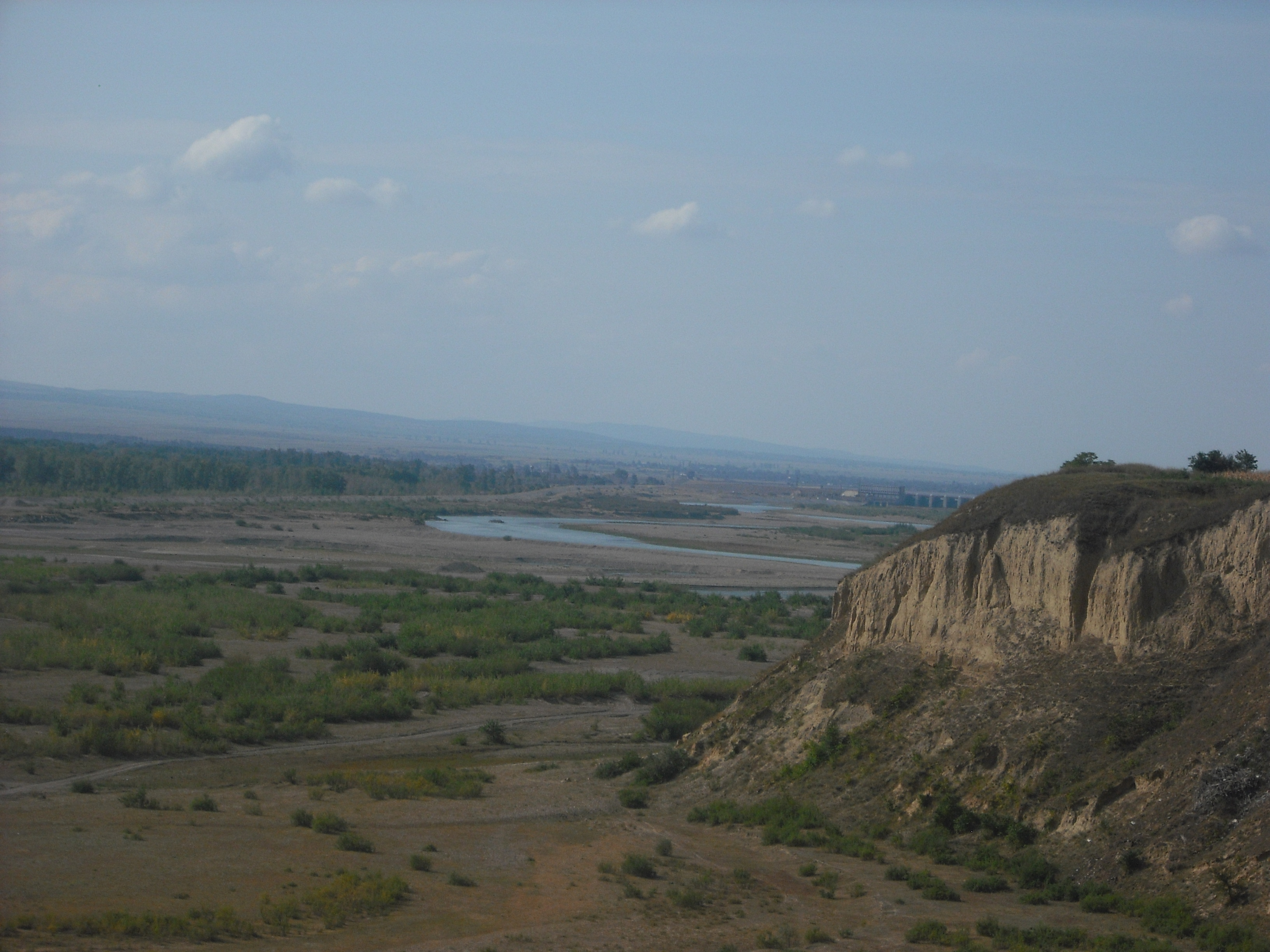

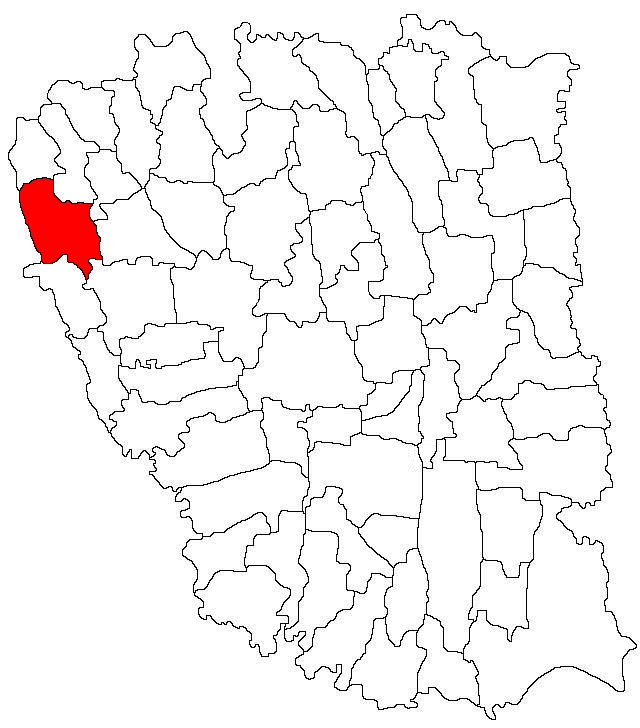
- Location in Galați County

- Location in Romania
- Coordinates: 45°55′45″N 27°18′42″E
- Country: Romania
- County: Galați
- Population (2021-12-01): 4,037
- Time zone: UTC+02:00 (EET)
  - Summer (DST): UTC+03:00 (EEST)
- Vehicle reg.: GL

Nicorești is a commune in Galați County, Western Moldavia, Romania with a population of 6,099 people. It is composed of ten villages: Braniștea, Coasta Lupei, Dobrinești, Fântâni, Grozăvești, Ionășești, Mălureni, Nicorești, Piscu Corbului and Sârbi. It included two other villages until 2004, when they were split off to form Poiana Commune.

== Natives ==
- Aurica Bărăscu
