= Talna =

Talna Talna Mare
- Location within Romania

Location
- Country: Romania
- Counties: Satu Mare County

Physical characteristics
- Mouth: Tur
  - location: Gherța Mică
  - coordinates: 47.9140°N 23.2096°E
- Length: 38 km (24 mi)
- Basin size: 176 km^{2} (68 sq mi)

Basin features
- Progression: Tur→ Tisza→ Danube→ Black Sea

The Talna is a left tributary of the river Tur in Romania. It discharges into the Tur in Gherța Mică. Its length is 38 km (24 mi) and its basin size is 176 km^{2} (68 sq mi). The upper reach of the river, upstream of the junction with the Talna Mică, is sometimes considered to be a headwater of the river and is referred to as Talna Mare.

== Tributaries ==
The following rivers are tributaries to the river Talna:

- Left: Brada, Talna Mică, Racșa, Pleșca, Valea Muntelui
