= Tur (river) =

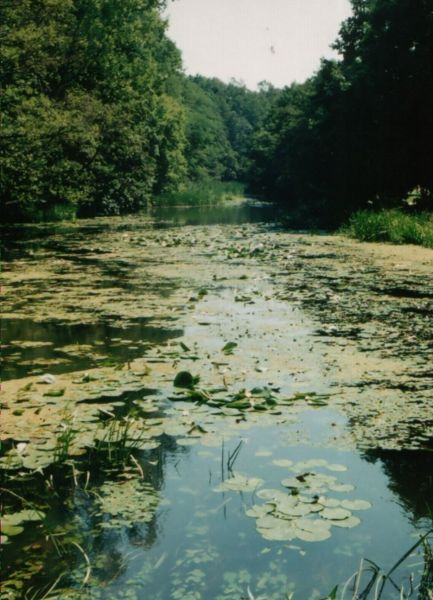

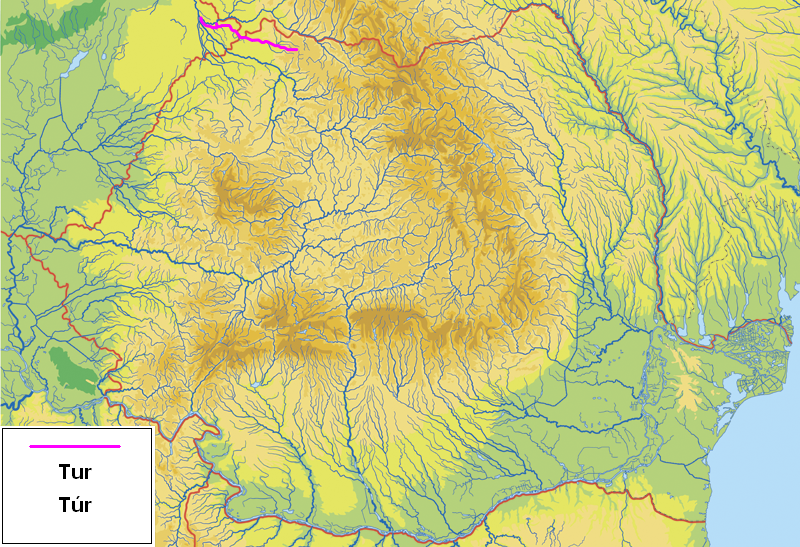

Location
- Country: Romania, Hungary
- Counties: Satu Mare County, Szabolcs-Szatmár-Bereg County
- Towns: Negrești-Oaș

Physical characteristics
- Source: Oaș Mountains
- Mouth: Tisza
  - location: Szatmárcseke
  - coordinates: 48.0919°N 22.6760°E
- Length: 94.6 km (58.8 mi)
- Basin size: 1,262 km^{2} (487 sq mi)
- Discharge
  - location: Near mouth
  - average: (Period: 1971–2000)14.03 m^{3}/s (495 cu ft/s)

Basin features
- Progression: Tisza→ Danube→ Black Sea

The Tur (Hungarian: Túr) is a tributary of the river Tisza. Its sources are located in the Oaș Mountains in Romania. The Tur starts at the confluence of its headwaters, the Gorova and Turișor. It then flows through Satu Mare County in Romania. The main town on the Tur is Negrești-Oaș. The river then forms the border between Romania and Ukraine on a reach of 5.2 km (3.2 mi), and the border between Romania and Hungary for 1.1 km (0.68 mi). The Tur joins the Tisza river near Szatmárcseke in Hungary. Its basin size is 1,144 km^{2} (442 sq mi).

== Tributaries ==
The following rivers are tributaries to the river Tur:

- Left: Strâmba, Talna, Racta, Egherul Mare.
- Right: Valea Rea, Turț.
