= Humour (disambiguation) =

Humour is something that may amuse.

Humor or Humour also may refer to:

- Humors, the blood, biles, and phlegm in the old medical theory of humorism
- Mănăstirea Humorului, a commune in Suceava County, Romania, sometimes known as Humor
  - Humor Monastery in Mănăstirea Humorului commune, Romania
- Humor, a tributary of the Bistrița in Suceava County, Romania
- Humor (Moldova), a tributary of the Moldova in Suceava County, Romania
- Humor: International Journal of Humor Research
- NPO Humor TV, a defunct Dutch television channel

== See also ==
- Anatomic fluids adjacent to lens of vertebrate eye:
  - Aqueous humour, watery and behind cornea
  - Vitreous humour, gel-like and in front of retina
