= Valea Vinului (disambiguation) =

Valea Vinului may refer to the following places in Romania:

- Valea Vinului, a commune of Satu Mare County
- Valea Vinului, a village in the commune Rodna, Bistrița-Năsăud County
- Valea Vinului, a tributary of the Cormaia in Bistrița-Năsăud County
- Valea Vinului (Someș), a tributary of the Someș in Satu Mare County
- Valea Vinului, a tributary of the Taița in Tulcea County
- Valea Vinului (Vișeu), a tributary of the Vișeu in Maramureș County
- Valea Vinului, another name for the river Pârâul Vinului in Harghita County

== See also ==
- Valea (disambiguation)
- Vinu (name)
