= Valea Borcutului =

Valea Borcutului (Hungarian: Borpatak) may refer to several places in Romania:

- Valea Borcutului, a village in Sângeorz-Băi town, Bistrița-Năsăud County
- Valea Borcutului, a village in Baia Mare city, Maramureș County

== See also ==
- Borcut River (disambiguation)
- Borcutul River (disambiguation)
- Valea (disambiguation)
