= Largu River =

Largu River may refer to:

- Largu, a tributary of the Bistra in Neamț County
- Largu, another name for the river Bolătău in Neamț County

== See also ==
- Larga River (disambiguation)
- Larga Mare River
- Larga Mică River
- Valea Largă River (disambiguation)
