= Valea Seacă =

Valea Seacă may refer to several places in Romania:

Populated places:

- Valea Seacă, Bacău, a commune
- Valea Seacă, Iași, a commune
- Valea Seacă, a village in Nicolae Bălcescu Commune, Bacău County
- Valea Seacă, a village in Sânzieni Commune, Covasna County
- Valea Seacă, a village in Râciu Commune, Mureș County
- Valea Seacă, a village in Bălțătești Commune, Neamț County
- Valea Seacă, a village in Gornet-Cricov Commune, Prahova County
- Valea Seacă, a village in Tarna Mare Commune, Satu Mare County
- Valea Seacă, a village in Tătărăni Commune, Vaslui County
- Valea Seacă, a district in the town of Lehliu Gară, Călărași County
- Valea Seacă, the name until 1968 of Ștefan cel Mare Commune, Bacău County
- Valea Seacă, until 1967 a village in Valu lui Traian Commune, Constanța County
- Valea Seacă, the former name of Valea Moldovei in Suceava county

Rivers:

- Valea Seacă, tributary of the Casimcea in Constanța County
- Valea Seacă, tributary of the Cașin in Covasna County
- Valea Seacă, tributary of the Corozel in Galați County
- Valea Seacă, tributary of the Dâmbovița in Argeș County
- Valea Seacă, tributary of the Danube–Black Sea Canal in Constanța County
- Valea Seacă, tributary of the Doftana in Prahova County
- Valea Seacă, tributary of the Lotru in Vâlcea County
- Valea Seacă, tributary of the Olt near Rotbav, Brașov County
- Valea Seacă, tributary of the Prahova near Azuga, Prahova County
- Valea Seacă, tributary of the Prahova near Bușteni, Prahova County
- Valea Seacă, tributary of the Secaș in Alba County
- Valea Seacă, tributary of the Suseni in Gorj County
- Valea Seacă, tributary of the Tărâia in Gorj County
- Valea Seacă (Topolița), tributary of the Topolița in Neamț County
- Valea Seacă, tributary of the Valea Cerbului in Prahova County
- Valea Seacă, tributary of the Valea de Pești in Hunedoara and Gorj Counties
- Valea Seacă, tributary of the Vărbilău in Prahova County
- Valea Seacă a Baiului, a tributary of the Valea Cerbului in Prahova County
- Valea Seacă a Jepilor, a tributary of the Prahova in Prahova County
- Valea Secărei, a tributary of the Vărbilău in Prahova County
- Valea Seciului, a tributary of the Prahova in Prahova County

== See also ==
- Valea (disambiguation)
