= Pârâul Lung =

Pârâul Lung may refer to the following rivers in Romania:

- Pârâul Lung, a tributary of the Aita in Covasna County
- Pârâul Lung, a tributary of the Valea Cerbului in Prahova County
