= Scurt =

Scurt may refer to:

- Pârâul Scurt, tributary of the Lotru in Vâlcea County, Romania
- Pârâul Scurt, tributary of the Valea Cerbului in Prahova County, Romania
- Piciorul Scurt, tributary of the Tazlăul Sărat in Neamț County, Romania

== See also ==
- Skirt
