= Valea Viei =

Valea Viei may refer to several villages in Romania:

- Valea Viei, a village in the town of Pătârlagele, Buzău County
- Valea Viei, a village in the town of Turceni, Gorj County
- Valea Viei, a village in Nicolae Bălcescu Commune, Vâlcea County

== See also ==
- Valea (disambiguation)
