= Victor Săhleanu =

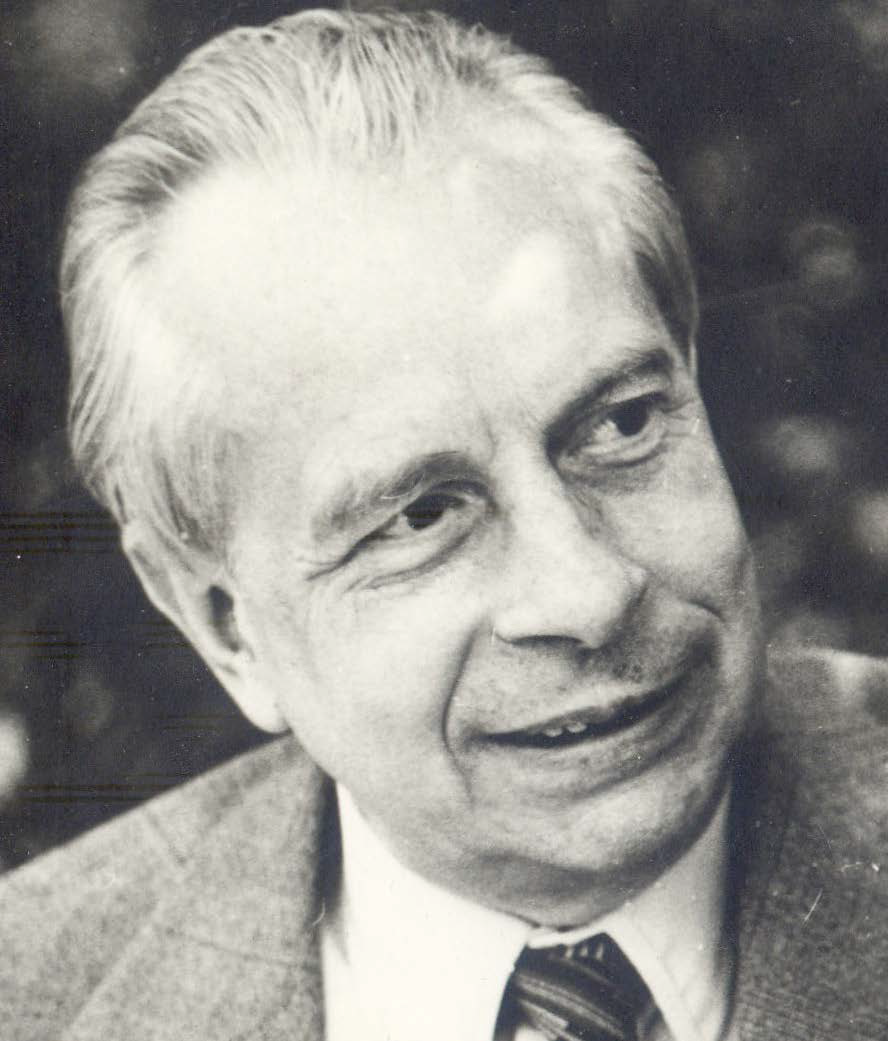
Victor Săhleanu

Victor Aurelian Săhleanu (Romanian: [ˈviktor a.ureliˈan səhˈle̯anu]; 19 January 1924 – 26 August 1997) was a Romanian physician and anthropologist. He was a leading figure in anthropology in his country from the late 1960s until his death.

== Biography ==
=== Education and early career ===
Săhleanu was born in Gura Humorului, in the Bukovina region of the Kingdom of Romania. After finishing secondary school at the Aron Pumnul High School in Cernăuți, he entered the medical faculty of the University of Bucharest, from which he graduated in 1948. At that point, with the onset of the Communist regime, the institution became the Carol Davila University of Medicine and Pharmacy. Between 1944 and 1946, he took part-time courses at the literature and philosophy faculty as well, but did not earn a degree. In 1949, he became a doctor of medicine and surgery, with a thesis on "Considerations regarding Field Medicine". Ștefan-Marius Milcu presided over the doctoral committee, which also included Constantin Ion Parhon. He began working in hospitals while still a student, and during 1946, was a junior teaching assistant in the anatomical pathology department.

After graduation in 1948, he won a competition to become an intern at the Parhon-led endocrinology institute, where he was also a researcher from 1954 to 1961. He worked in endocrinology for a total of seventeen years, during which he founded the institute's morphopathology laboratory. From 1950 to 1952, he was a peer reviewer at the Milcu-led anthropology collective, a section of the endocrinology institute that was essentially a continuation of the Francisc Rainer-founded anthropology institute. In 1954, he signed up for part-time classes at the physics and mathematics faculty in Bucharest, graduating in 1961.

=== Involvement in anthropology and legacy ===
In 1963, he became a primary care endocrinologist and, at the request of Eugen A. Pora, began teaching courses in biophysics and biomathematics at Babeș-Bolyai University in Cluj. In 1965, he earned the title of Doctor of Science. The same year, he was transferred from the endocrinology to the geriatrics institute. In 1969, he was transferred from Babeș-Bolyai and named adjunct scientific director at Bucharest's center for anthropological research; from that point until his death, he was at the forefront of anthropology in Romania. In 1974, when the center became a laboratory within the Victor Babeș institute, Săhleanu became its director, serving for eight years.

In 1982, due to the so-called "Transcendental Meditation Affair", he was excluded from scientific life. His works were withdrawn from libraries, his name could no longer appear in books or publications, and he was transferred to work as a doctor at a hospital in the Titan neighborhood. In 1984, aged 60, he retired upon his request. Between 1982 and 1984, he taught postgraduate courses in anthropology at a United Nations demographic center in Bucharest. As an anthropologist, he developed an interdisciplinary approach to the field that combined biology and culture, exploring the relationship between anatomical features and their behavioral, symbolic and cultural significance. In 1980, he was editor-in-chief of Romania's first atlas of biological anthropology.

In February 1990, after the fall of the regime, he was restored as head of the Romanian Academy's anthropological research center, by government decree. He died in 1997, following complications from a cerebral hemorrhage. He and his wife Zoe, a pediatrician, had two sons: Adrian George, who became a philologist and psychoanalyst; and Valentin, later an architect.

Săhleanu published over 2000 articles and 60 books, in fields that included methodology, medical psychology and psychoanalysis, ethics, aesthetics and the history of medicine and science. He kept a diary, from age 17 until his final days, that reached over 25,000 pages. He was also an essayist and poet, publishing volumes in 1961, 1972, 1977 and 1997; and was among the founders of the Romanian Society of Writer and Journalist Physicians.

Alexandru Ofrim stated that Săhleanu wrote communist propaganda against erotic pleasure.

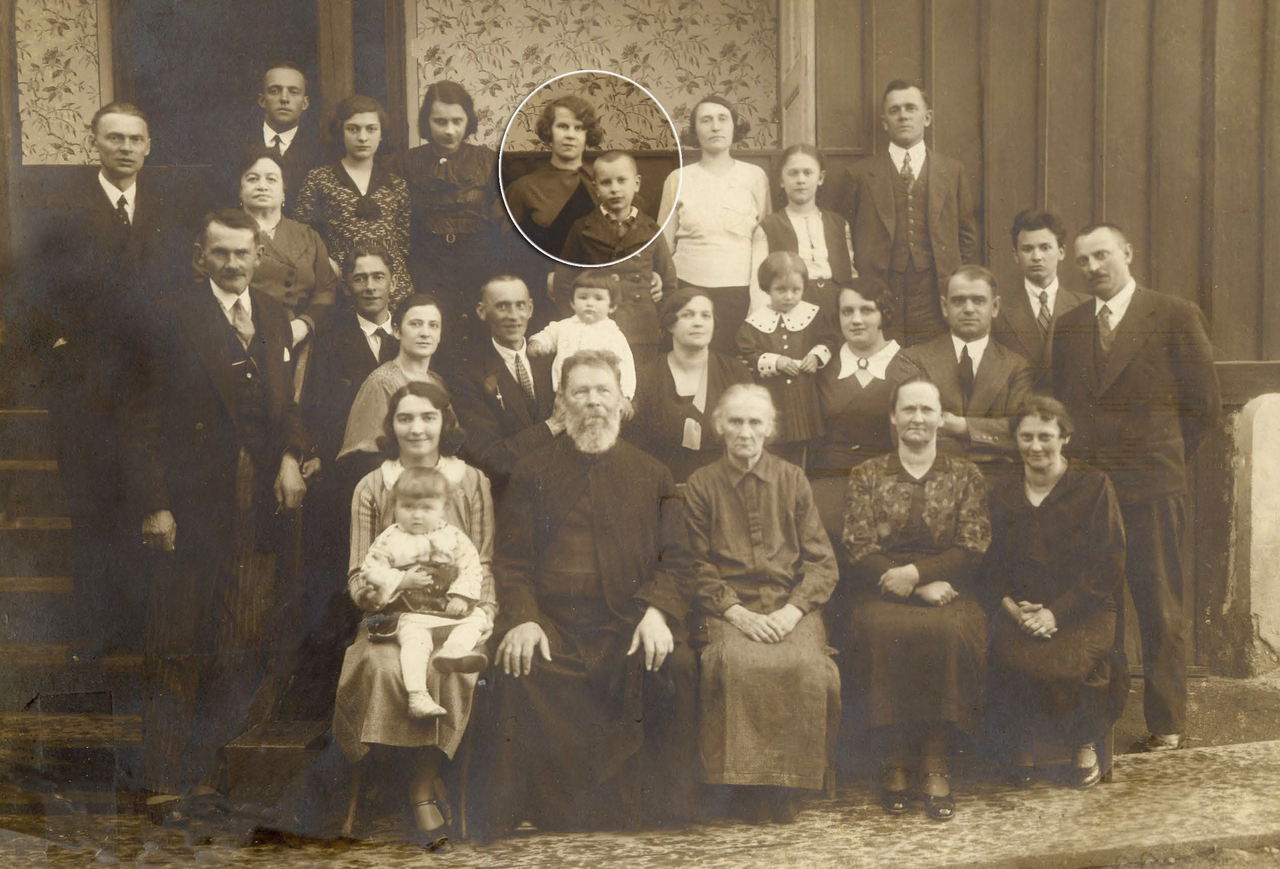
With his mother at a family reunion in 1935

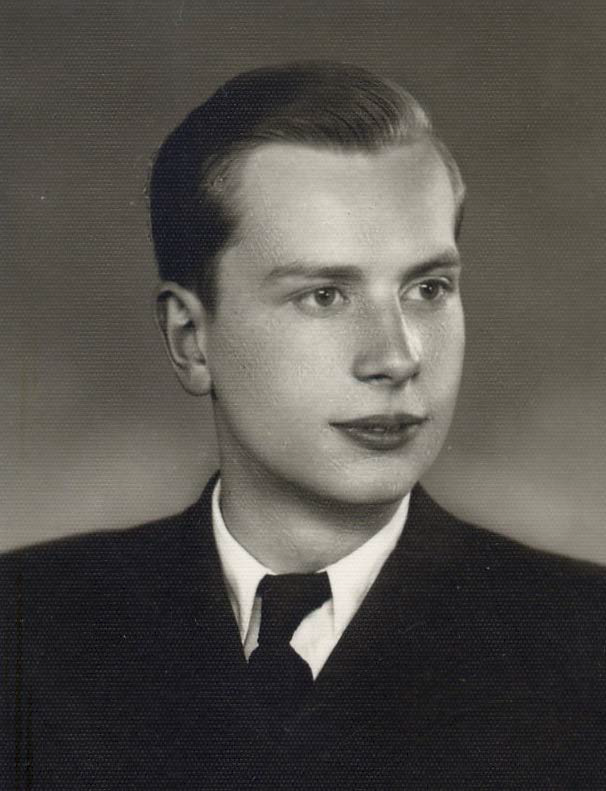
As a high school student

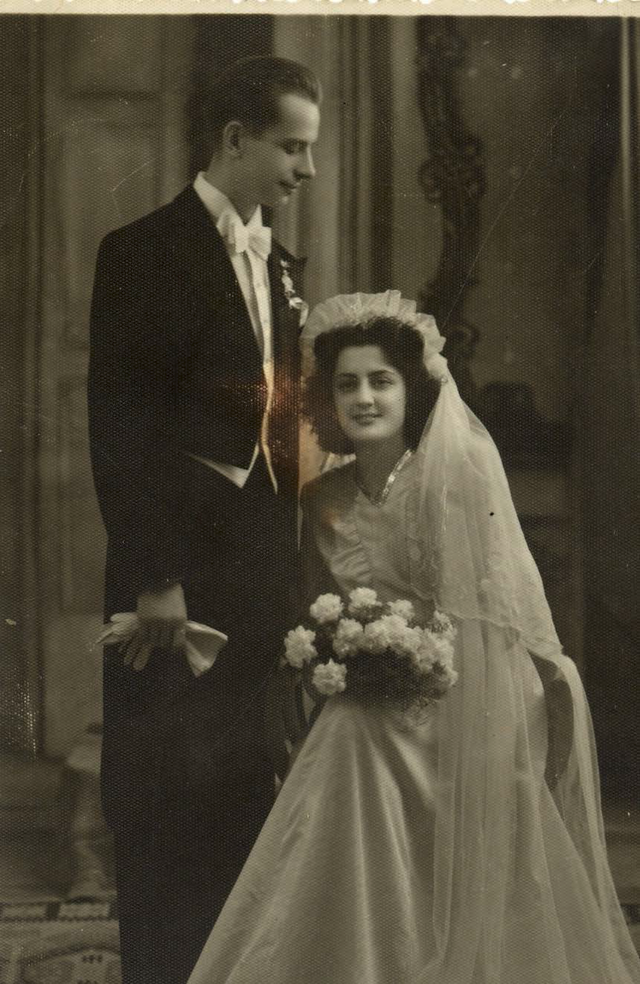
At his wedding in 1948

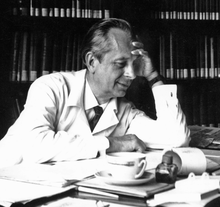
In his office at the anthropology institute
