= Valea Rece =

Valea Rece may refer to the following places in Romania:

- Valea Rece, a village in Lunca de Jos commune, Harghita County
- Valea Rece, a village in Band commune, Mureș County
- Valea Rece, a tributary of the Bistrița in Vâlcea County
- Valea Rece, a tributary of the Borșa in Cluj County
- Valea Rece, a tributary of the Crișul Repede in Bihor County
- Valea Rece, a tributary of the Cheia in Vâlcea County
- Valea Rece (Trotuș), a tributary of the Trotuș in Harghita County
- Valea Rece de Jos, a tributary of the Doftana in Brașov County

== See also ==
- Valea (disambiguation)
