= Humor Monastery =

Monastery in Romania

Coordinates: 47°35′35″N 25°51′25″E

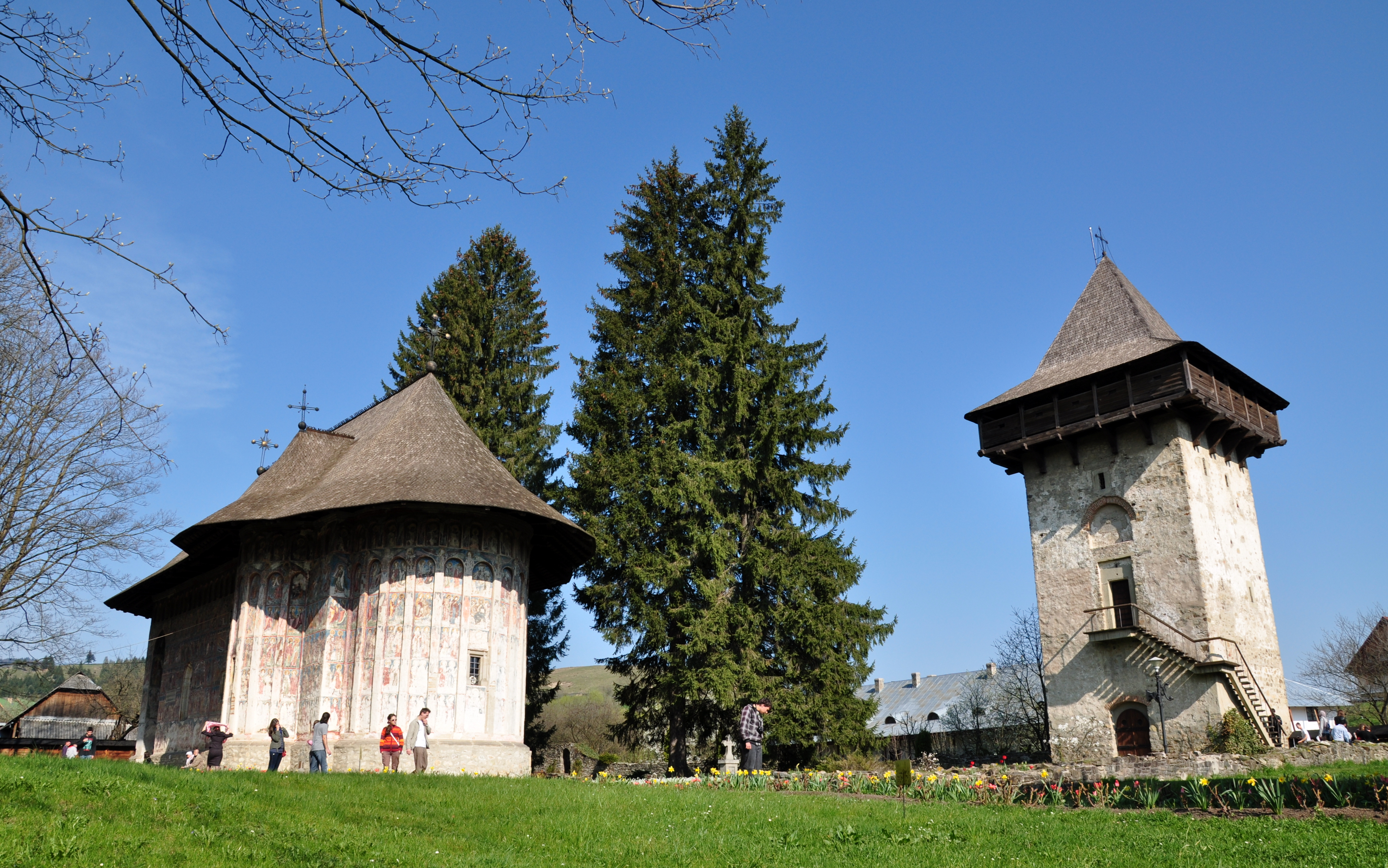
The church of the Humor Monastery with its fortified tower

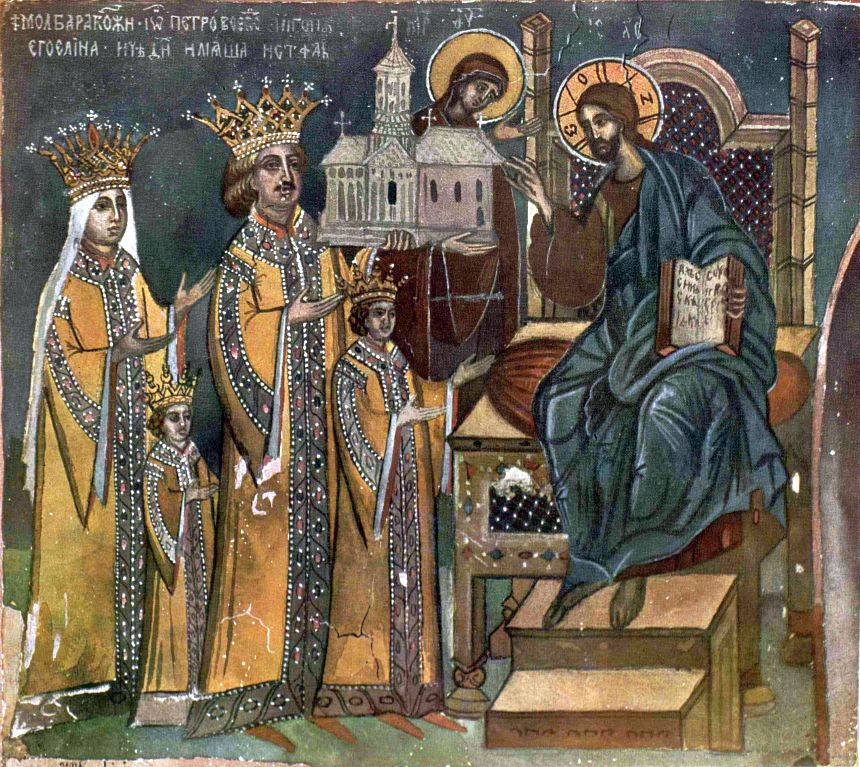
Voivode of Moldavia, Petru Rareş depiction

Humor Monastery located in Mănăstirea Humorului, about 5 km north of the town of Gura Humorului, Romania. It is a monastery for nuns dedicated to the Dormition of Virgin Mary, or Theotokos. It was constructed in 1530 by Voievod Petru Rareş and his chancellor Teodor Bubuiog. The monastery was built over the foundation of a previous monastery that dated from around 1415. The Humor monastery was closed in 1786 and was not reopened until 1990.

The church has been inscribed by UNESCO on its list of World Heritage Sites, as one of the Painted churches of Moldavia.

== Frescoes ==
Humor was one of the first of Moldavia's painted monasteries to be frescoed and, along with Voroneţ, is probably the best preserved. The dominant colour of the frescoes is a reddish brown. The master painter responsible for Humor's frescoes, which were painted in 1535, is one Toma of Suceava.

The subjects of the frescoes at Humor include the Siege of Constantinople and the Last Judgment, common on the exterior of the painted monasteries of Bucovina, but also the Hymn to the Virgin inspired by the poem of Patriarch Sergius of Constantinople relating to the miraculous intervention of the Theotokos in saving the city from Persian conquest in 626. The Persians are, however, depicted as Turks which is a common device in these monasteries, their paintings being used in part for political propaganda in addition to their spiritual meaning.
