= Ion Al-George =

Romanian writer, librarian, and soldier (1891–1957)

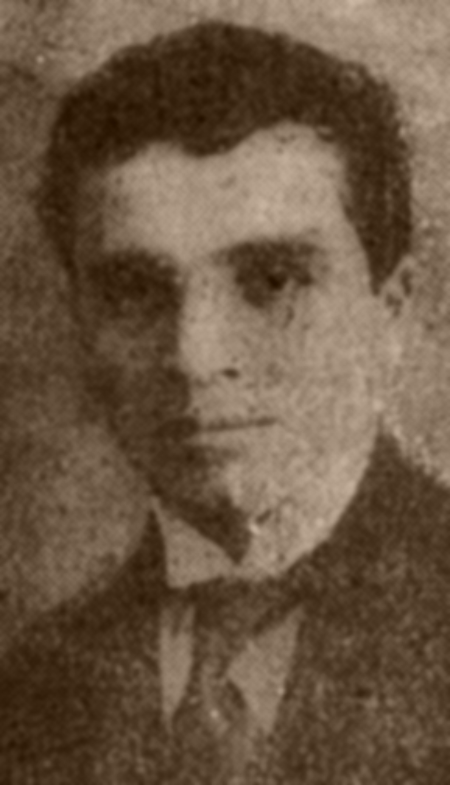
- Al-George in 1914
- Born: 27 March 1891; Oláhszentgyörgy (Sângeorz-Băi), Beszterce-Naszód County, Transleithania, Austria-Hungary
- Died: 9 January 1957 (aged 65); Bucharest, Romanian People's Republic
- Occupations: Journalist; editor; librarian; translator; soldier; actor
- Writing career
- Period: 1909–1957
- Genres: Lyric poetry; elegy; verse drama; comedy of manners; autobiographical novel
- Movements: Neoclassicism; Parnassianism; Symbolism (Romanian)

Ion Al-George or Al. George (27 March 1891 – 9 January 1957) was an Austro-Hungarian-born Romanian writer. He and his brother Vasile were of Romani ethnicity, but assimilated into the Romanian culture of Transylvania. In 1912, they both emigrated into the Kingdom of Romania, where they trained as actors; Ion performed in at least one play as a student. Neither of the Al-Georges ever sought employment in that field, with Ion himself serving for 27 years as librarian of the Royal Foundations (Fundațiile Regale) in Bucharest. Both brothers were mainly active as poets and magazine editors, but differed in approach and style: the award-winning Ion turned to a formal neoclassicism, of the kind that was being cultivated by an offshoot of the Symbolist movement; the more discreet Vasile found his inspiration in rural traditionalism. Their mirrored careers were interrupted by World War I, which saw them taking up arms in defense of Romanian territory. Ion was an officer of the Romanian Land Forces, and continued to write while in the trenches of Western Moldavia. His production of the time includes two war-themed plays, co-written with Ștefan Tătărescu.

Following the union of Transylvania with Romania, the brothers parted: Vasile moved to Târgu Mureș, giving up poetry in favor of the civil service and activism with the ASTRA society. Ion was largely focused on his work as an editor, generally putting out updated versions of his youthful poems; his work as a translator (mainly of Ancient Greek and Renaissance literature) was only sporadically published. He gave up on writing by the time of World War II. Affected by the loss of a son, and by illness, he became indigent during the early stages of Romanian communism. Ion Al-George died in 1957, followed shortly after by his brother. The family survived though Vasile's son, the physician and Indologist Sergiu Al-George, who was serving time as a political prisoner.

== Biography ==
=== Emigration and debut ===
Al-George was born as an Austro-Hungarian subject in Oláhszentgyörgy (Sângeorz-Băi), on 27 March 1891. He had two brothers: an older one, Flore, who taught for a living, and a younger one, Vasile, who was himself a noted poet. Their parents were the local peasants Leon and Maria Al-George, both of whom had Romanian Romani background. According to literary historian George Călinescu, Maria coincidentally had the same birth surname as her husband, and, like him, belonged to the Greek Catholic Church. Ion attended primary school locally, before spending five years at the Grenzregiment Gymnasium in Naszód (Năsăud). Ion and Vasile then opted to emigrate into the Romanian Kingdom, settling in its capital city of Bucharest. Here, they attended the Conservatory of Dramatic Arts, class of 1912—the same as Maria Giurgea and Elvira Popescu. Ion was once praised by Viitorul newspaper for his student performance in Octave Mirbeau's Portefeuille (March 1912).

As scholar Gheorghe Hrimiuc-Toporaș observes, Ion's 1922 piece Fragment dintr-un roman ("Fragment of a Novel") suggests that had embraced bohemianism as a youth. His literary debut is traced to 1909, when Convorbiri Literare hosted his translation of a German poem by Carmen Sylva. The following year, he began publishing his own poems and articles in the newspapers Epoca and Ordinea. H completed his only work in verse drama, Sapho, which, although channeling classical antiquity, was essentially a comedy of manners. It was first published in Zorile journal of 1912. The young graduate never turned to professional acting; on 1 May 1913, he became a librarian at the Royal Foundations, where he stayed until retirement in 1940.

Also in 1913, Ion printed in Câmpina his first volume, Aquile ("Eagles"). It won him a Romanian Academy prize, on Duiliu Zamfirescu's recommendation. The works are almost entirely set in the classical world, and reveal Al-George's location on the neoclassical and parniassian fringes of the Symbolist movement. While acknowledging that Al-George had "a set of skills", Călinescu regarded the series as unoriginal, believing that they resembled a category of poems by the (otherwise more modernizing) Symbolist Ion Minulescu. The same scholar observes that Al-George took neoclassicism beyond what other similarly minded poets had done, introducing Latin phonology. This technique, ultimately borrowed from historian Vasile Pârvan, "was ridiculed." A single piece of Aquile has a modern, nationalist, message—inspired by Octavian Goga, it shows him longing for his native Transylvania. Such links were also noted by Nicolae Iorga, the historian and nationalist ideologue, who observed that, at his best, Al-George resembled Goga at his worst.

=== World War I ===
In the lead-up to World War I, Al-George was mistaken for another debuting poet, Ion Sân-Giorgiu. In July 1914, he publicly responded to the confusion, adding his personal musings about Sân-Giorgiu's birth name and origins, which then promoted Sân-Giorgiu to intervene with another clarification. Al-George had by then joined the Romanian Writers' Society and became a major contributor to the magazine Arta (with texts he also signed as Terentius, Varro, and Ion Vilica) and to Ilustrațiunea Neamului Nostru (as Ion Al. Francesco and Ion Al. Cozia), while also being featured in Gazeta de Transilvania, Flacăra, Rampa, Cosînzeana, and Cuvântul Nostru. His scattered poems were collected for the 1916 volume, Domus taciturna. Poet George Topîrceanu, who had panned Aquile as formulaic, was impressed by the follow-up, noting that its imagery is "birthed, rather than fabricated"; this contrasts with Iorga, for whom the Domus taciturna series is merely "faint". According to Hrimiuc-Toporaș, these pieces embrace the format of neoclassical elegies; their focus on ancient landscapes is not stale, since Al-George often renounced "rhetorical emphasis", finding his originality in "serene intimacy". Domus taciturna also included his renditions of Pindar, Cleanthes, Moschus, Bion, of Dante Aligheri (cantos I and II of the Inferno), and of Michelangelo's sonnets.

Once Romania entered the war in 1916, Al-George began his career with the Romanian Land Forces. He and Vasile withdrew into Western Moldavia during subsequent defeats; Ion attended an officers' school in Botoșani and fought in the trenches, all the while continuing to write poems inspired by the events (some of which were first published in the local paper, Moldova Veche). The war is also the background of two plays, co-written with Ștefan Tătărescu—Fugarul ("The Fugitive") and Sângele neamului ("Blood of the Nation"). The former was performed on the front; both were published in 1919. The Al-Georges returned to civilian life in postwar Greater Romania, which, by late 1918, had incorporated their native region. In late 1919, the military-led Văitoianu cabinet openly embraced antisemitic nationalism, coupled with anti-communism, allowing Bucharest to be plastered with posters that denounced the "red beasts". Ilie Moscovici of the Socialist Party publicly denounced Ion Al-George as the author of such propaganda; Al-George neither confirmed nor denied that this was the case.

=== Later life ===
Vasile Al-George opted to settle in Cluj, where he directed literary magazines, and later in Târgu Mureș, where he worked in social services and put out a local newspaper. He published poetry that was to a degree inspired by Symbolist themes, toned down by a populist traditionalism in the Sămănătorul vein. In Târgu Mureș, he worked as an editor for the nationalist organization ASTRA. Historian Vasile Netea, who met him in that context, recalls that, in his forties, Vasile had cased being at all interested in poetry—unlike Ion, who had "an entirely different nature". Still in Bucharest, Ion married Eugenia Boerescu, from whom he had a son, Ovidiu "Dudu" Al-George (born 1920).

Ion Al-George directed two popular magazines, Apărătorii Patriei and Eroii, while sending verse to be published in Flacăra and Convorbiri Literare (both of which employed him on their editorial staffs). Like the works he sent to Săgetătorul, Sburătorul, and Gândirea, these were mostly polished versions of his pre-1916 contributions. They were still sampled by Ion Pillat and Perpessicius in their 1928 anthology of contemporary verse. Ion was also involved with ASTRA, but as a delegate of the Bucharest Free University. In May 1928, he conferenced at ASTRA chapters in Hunedoara and Hațeg about the Romanian War of Independence (then on its 50th anniversary). During the 1930s, he was head librarian at the Foundations, sharing this distinction with Mircea Florian, Anastasie Mândru, and Alexandru Tzigara-Samurcaș; in this capacity, he obtained books for young intellectuals such as Emil Cioran and Arșavir Acterian.

Călinescu wrote in 1941 that the poet's work was already in the past—he had given up writing, "after going through some unknown process of literary disappointment." Al-George was later known to have been personally affected by World War II, in which he lost Ovidiu, who was his only child; the young had fought on the Eastern Front as a Vânători Sub-lieutenant, and had been killed in action, at Dalnyk, in November 1941. Upon the proclamation of a communist regime in 1948, the aging poet slid into extreme poverty, doubled by physical illness. In 1953, he tried to obtain copyrights on his translations, including versions of all the Sophoclean plays and of Theodor Mommsen's major tract (History of Rome); he also kept manuscript versions of poems by Anacreon. The writer died in Bucharest on 9 January 1957.

== Legacy ==
Al-George was outlived by his Vasile and by his brother Vasile and by Vasile's half-Bessarabian son, the physician, Indologist and translator Sergiu Al-George. Just months after his uncle's death, Sergiu was arrested by the regime and implicated in Constantin Noica's trial for conspiracy. His father died in 1960; Sergiu was released in four years later, during a general amnesty, continuing to practice medicine and write until his own death in 1981. Philologist Gavril Istrate, who had met Ion in his youth, observed in 2001 that neither he nor his brother were "representative poets", and as such that they had little recognition; he proposed that the family's peak fame had been with Sergiu, who nonetheless died young, "before fulfilling our expectations."
