= Mănăstirea Humorului =

- Commune
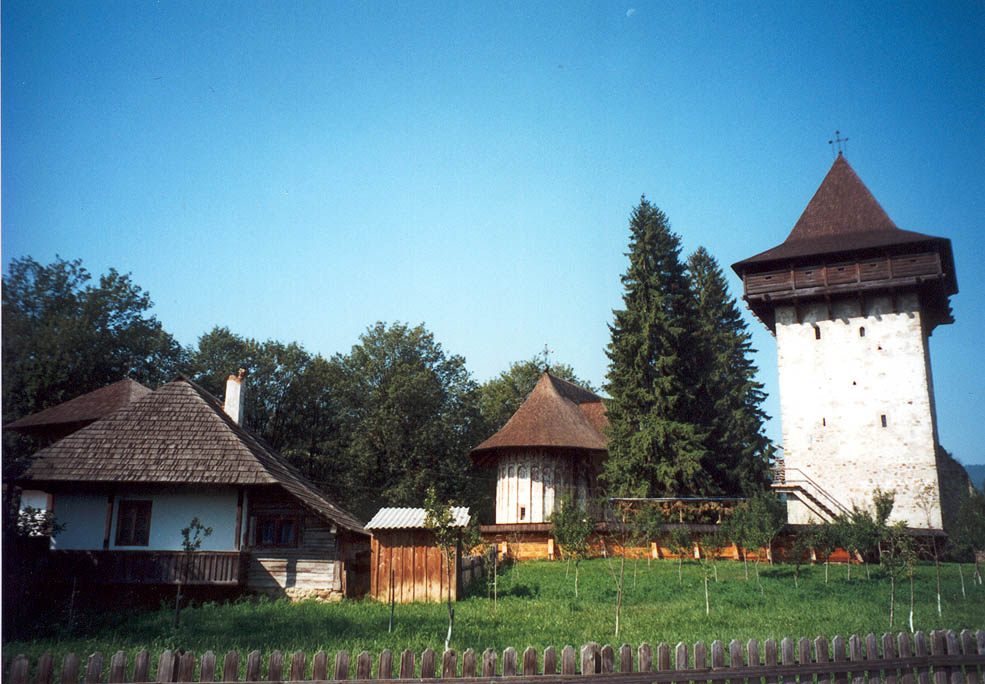
- Humor Monastery and its medieval fortified watchtower

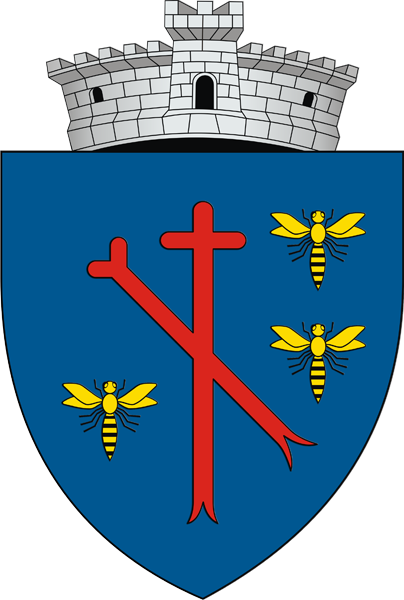
- Coat of arms

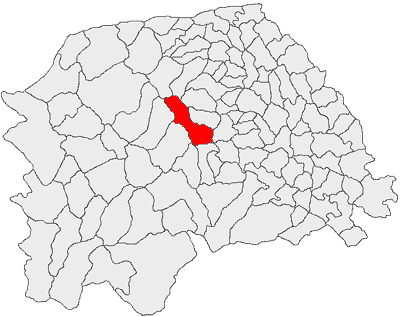
- Location in Suceava County

- Location in Romania
- Coordinates: 47°36′N 25°52′E
- Country: Romania
- County: Suceava

Government
  - Mayor (2020–2024): Viorel Croitoru (USR)
- Area: 96.28 km^{2} (37.17 sq mi)
- Elevation: 538 m (1,765 ft)
- Population (2021-12-01): 3,072
  - Density: 31.91/km^{2} (82.64/sq mi)
- Time zone: UTC+02:00 (EET)
  - Summer (DST): UTC+03:00 (EEST)
- Postal code: 727355
- Area code: +40 230
- Vehicle reg.: SV
- Website: www.manastirea-humorului.ro

Mănăstirea Humorului (German: Humora Kloster or Kloster Humora) is a commune located in Suceava County, in the historical region of Bukovina, northeastern Romania. It is composed of three villages, namely: Mănăstirea Humorului, Pleșa, and Poiana Micului. The 16th century Humor Monastery is located in the commune.

== Geography ==
The commune is situated in a hilly area, at an altitude of 538 m (1,765 ft), on the banks of the river Humor (a left tributary of the river Moldova). It is located in the central part of Suceava County, 6 km (3.7 mi) north of the town of Gura Humorului and 43 km (27 mi) west of the county seat, Suceava.

== Demographics ==
At the 2021 census, Mănăstirea Humorului had a population of 3,072, of which 76.95% were Romanians and 13.48% Poles. At the 2011 census, there were 3,233 inhabitants, of which 79.3% were Romanians, 19.6% Poles, and 1% Germans (more specifically, Bukovina Germans).

Slovaks settled in Poiana Micului in 1841–1842. Later, part of the community migrated to other areas of Bukovina. The Austrian census of 1890 recorded 50.9% of villagers as Polish speakers. The 1930 Romanian census found 45.3% were ethnic Poles. In 1936, a Slovak Catholic priest arrived from Czechoslovakia and began preaching in Slovak. From that point, some villagers began to identify as Slovak, while others insisted on their Polish identity. The Romanian authorities were drawn in, sending a Slovak schoolteacher, while the Polish Legation at Bucharest intervened on the side of the Polish villagers.

A survey of Slavic villagers taken in autumn 1937 found 67.1% declaring as Poles, and 32.9% as Slovaks. In 1942, the Catholic bishop of Iași estimated that half his parishioners there were Poles, half Slovaks. The 1948 census found 256 (67.9%) Polish speakers in Poiana Micului, and a total of 12 Czech and Slovak speakers in all of Câmpulung County.

== Administration and local politics ==
=== Communal council ===
The commune's current local council has the following political composition, according to the results of the 2020 Romanian local elections:

Party	Seats	Current Council
National Liberal Party (PNL)	4	
People's Movement Party (PMP)	3	
Save Romania Union (USR)	3	
Union of Poles of Romania (UPR)	1	
Social Democratic Party (PSD)	1	
Social Liberal Humanist Party (PUSL)	1	

== Pleșa ==
Pleșa village (Polish: Plesza) was founded by Poles in 1836. In 1880, it had a population of 222, including 217 Poles. After World War II, some Poles were repatriated from Pleșa to Złotnik, Poland. Today, nearly all its inhabitants remain Poles.

== Gallery ==
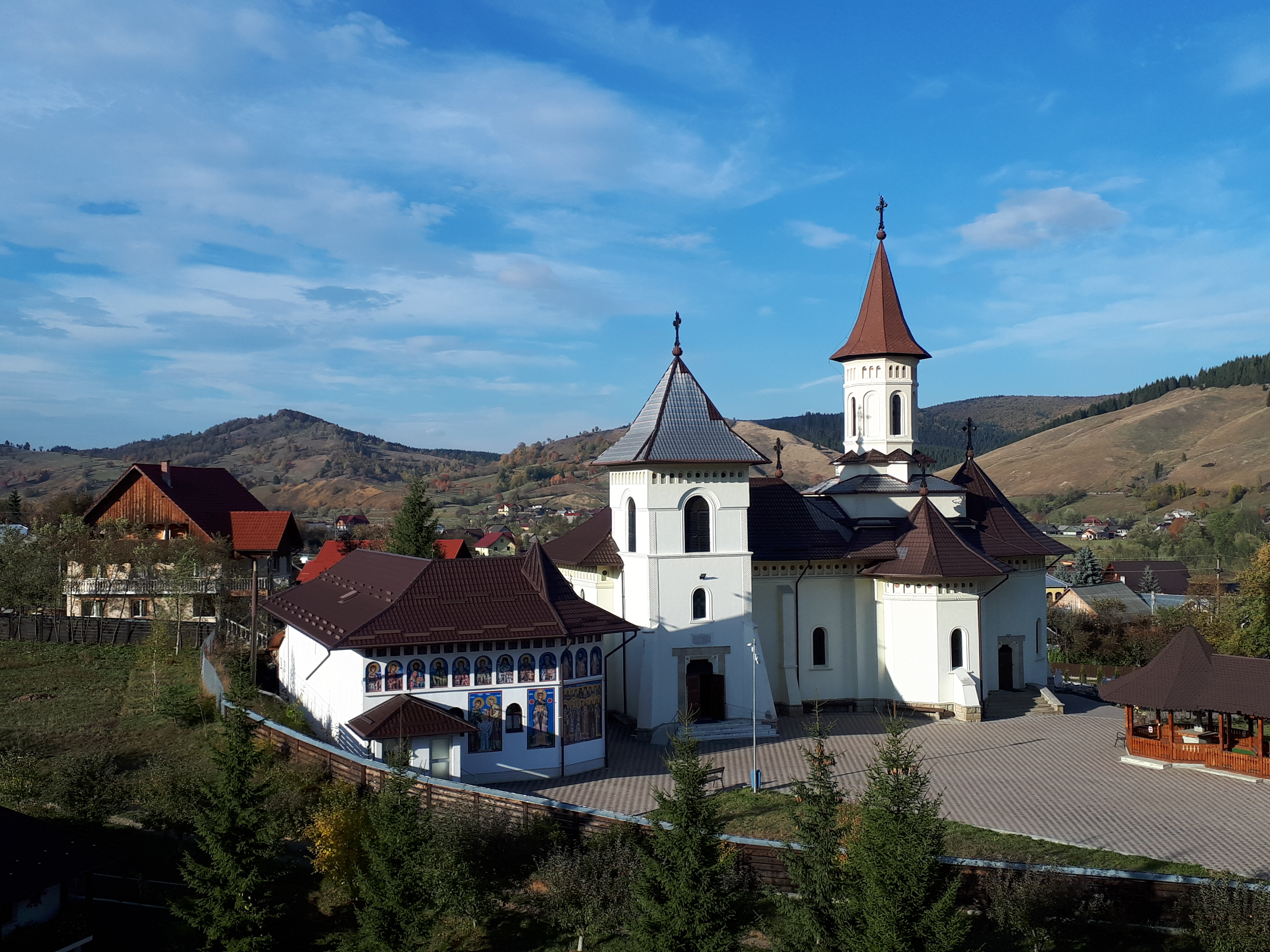
Church of the Assumption of Virgin Mary in Mănăstirea Humorului

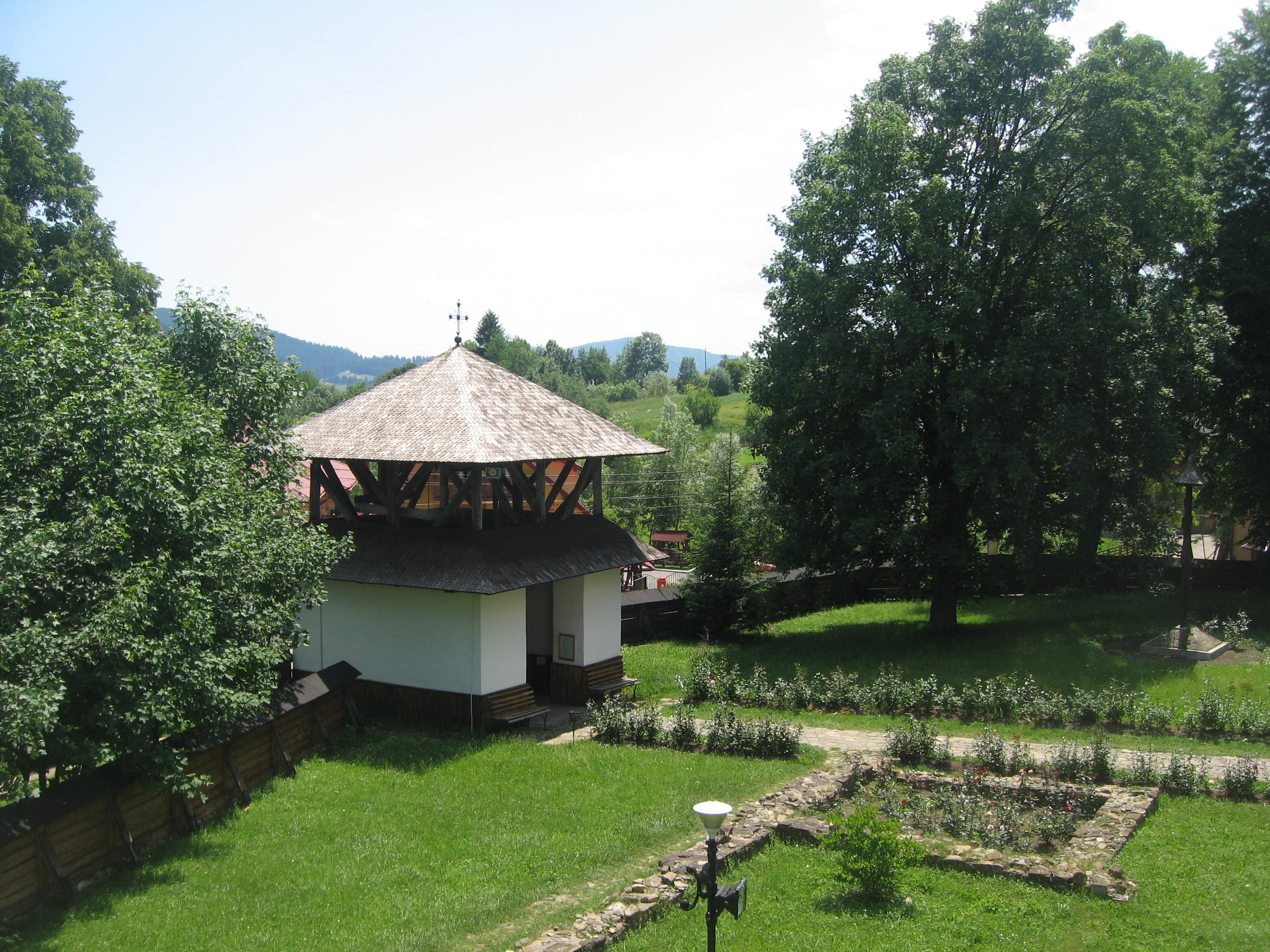
Bell tower of Humora Monastery

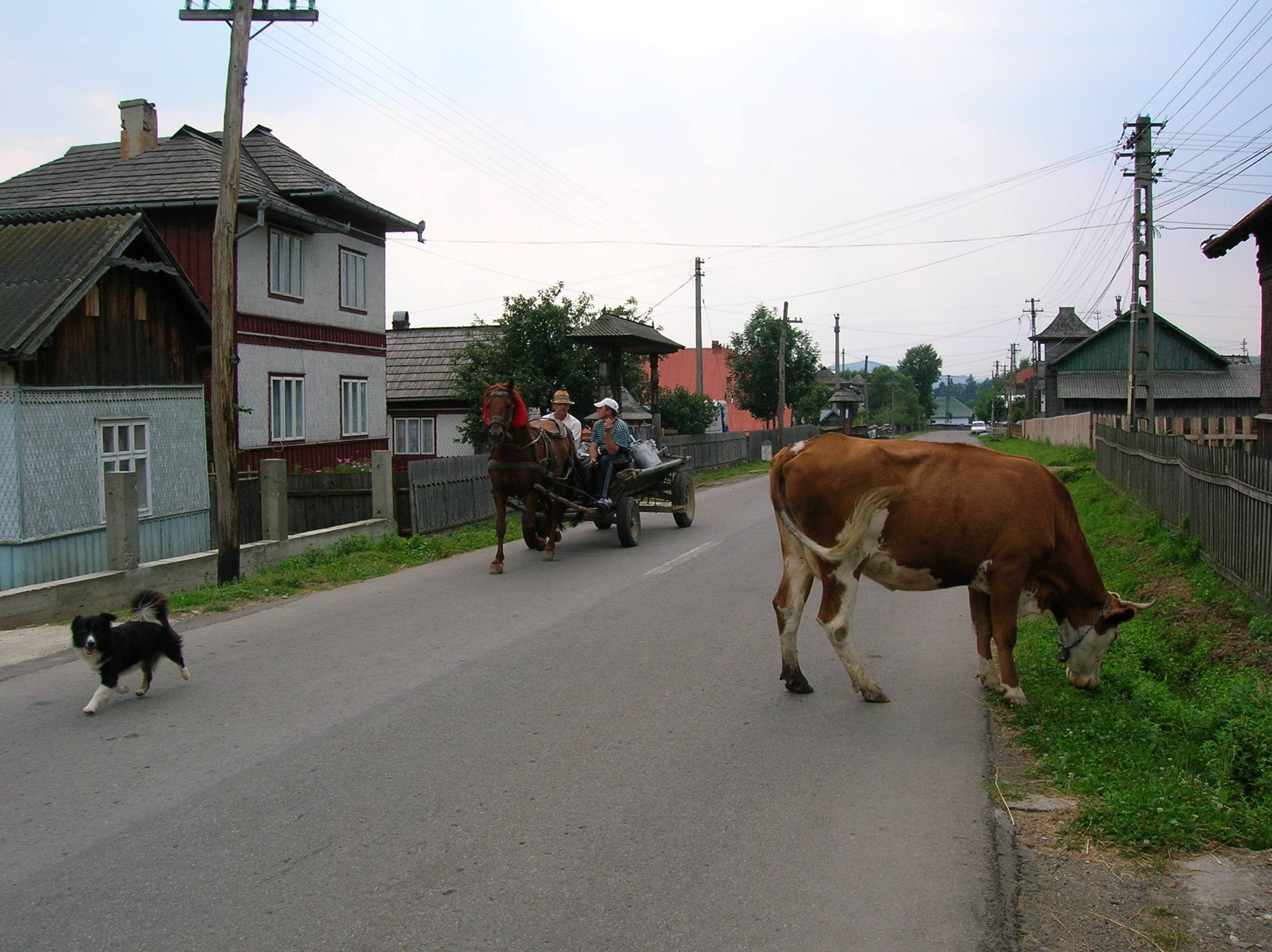
A road in Mănăstirea Humorului

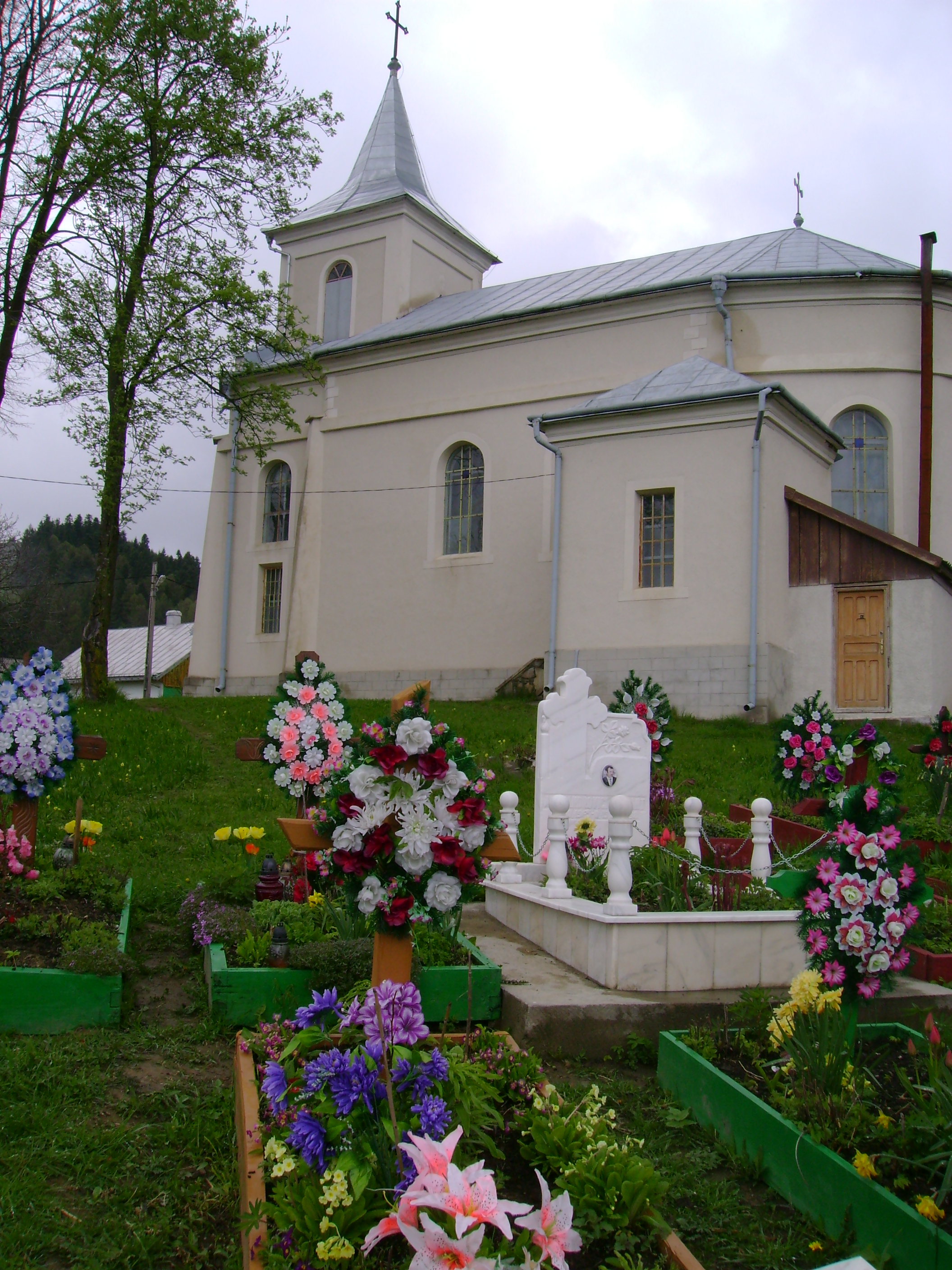
Pleșa cemetery and Catholic church

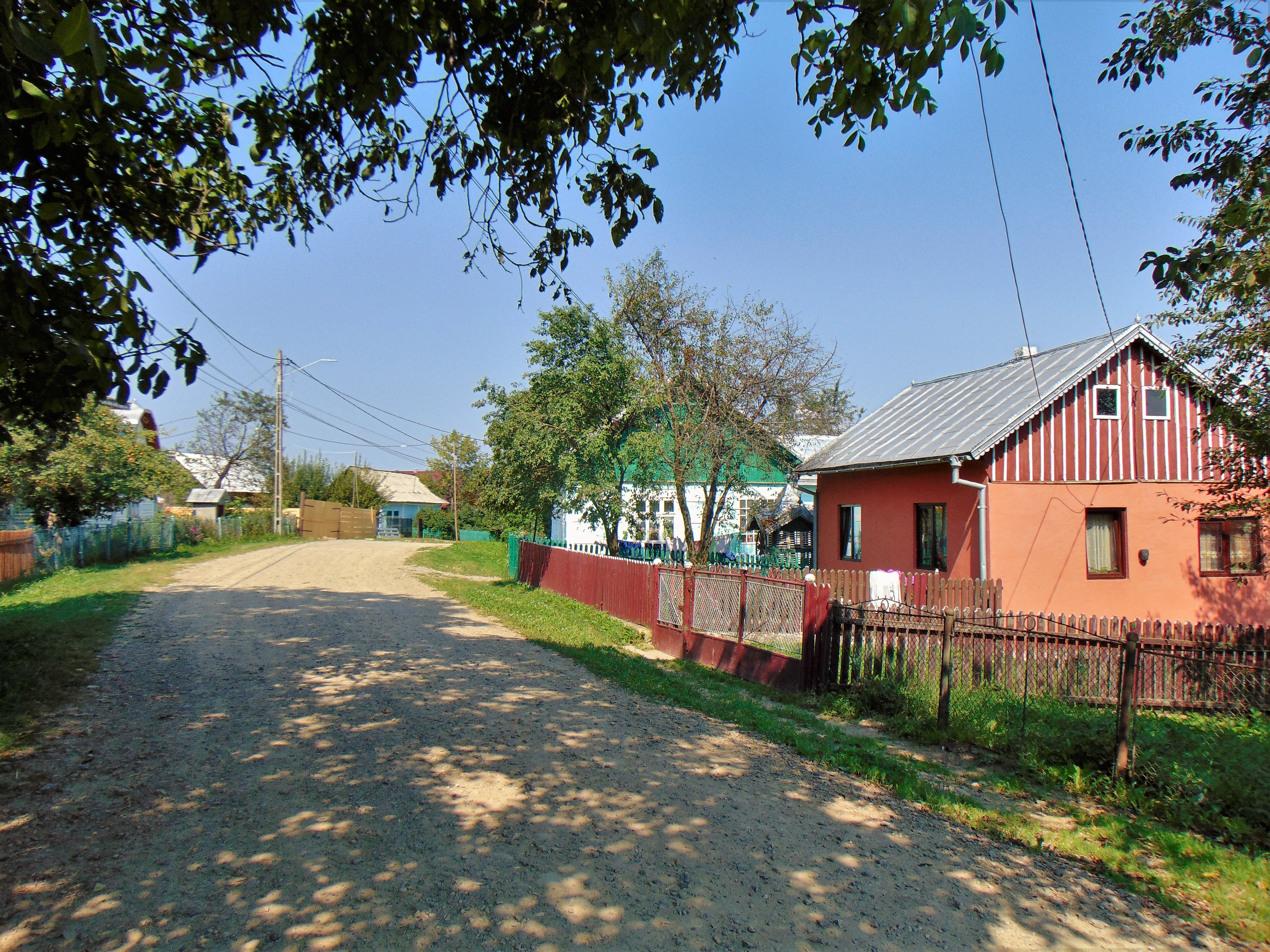
A road in Pleșa
