= Valea =

Valea may refer to several places in Romania:

- Valea, a village in Urmeniș Commune, Bistrița-Năsăud County
- Valea, a village in Pietrari Commune, Dâmbovița County
- Valea, a village in Bolboși Commune, Gorj County
- Valea, a village in Zam Commune, Hunedoara County
- Valea, a village in Vărgata Commune, Mureș County

and to a place in Moldova:

- Valea, a village in Cremenciug Commune, Soroca district
- Valea-Trestieni, a commune in Nisporeni district

and to a place in Ukraine:

- Valea, the Romanian name for Valy village, Karapchiv, Vyzhnytsia Raion, Chernivtsi Oblast

and to:

- Valea Pepelo

== See also ==
- Vale (disambiguation)
- Valea Albă (disambiguation)
- Valea Borcutului (disambiguation)
- Valea Largă (disambiguation)
- Valea Lungă (disambiguation)
- Valea Lupului (disambiguation)
- Valea Mare (disambiguation)
- Valea Perjei (disambiguation)
- Valea Rece (disambiguation)
- Valea Seacă (disambiguation)
- Valea Satului (disambiguation)
- Valea Ursului (disambiguation)
- Valea Verde (disambiguation)
- Valea Viei (disambiguation)
- Valea Vinului (disambiguation)
- Văleni (disambiguation)
- Vălișoara (disambiguation)
