= Valea Albă =

Valea Albă may refer to several places in Romania:

- Valea Albă, a village in Bucium Commune, Alba County
- Valea Albă, a village in Războieni Commune, Neamț County
- Valea Albă (Barcău), a tributary of the Barcău in Bihor County
- Valea Albă (Câlniștea), a tributary of the Câlniștea in Teleorman County
- Valea Albă, a tributary of the Prahova in Prahova County
- Valea Albă (Tur), in Satu Mare County
- Valea Albă, a tributary of the Vărbilău in Prahova County

== See also ==
- Valea (disambiguation)
