= Vălișoara (disambiguation) =

Vălișoara is a commune in Hunedoara County, Romania.

Vălișoara may also refer to the following places in Romania:

- Vălișoara, a village in Livezile Commune, Alba County
- Vălișoara, a village in Bucoșnița Commune, Caraș-Severin County
- Vălișoara, a village in Săvădisla Commune, Cluj County
- Vălișoara, a village in Balșa Commune, Hunedoara County
- Vălișoara, a village in Sânger Commune, Mureș County
- Vălișoara, a village in Letca Commune, Sălaj County
- Vălișoara, a tributary of the Timiș in Caraș-Severin County

== See also ==
- Valea (disambiguation)
