= Valea Lungă =

Valea Lungă may refer to several places in Romania:

- Valea Lungă, Alba, a commune in Alba County
- Valea Lungă, Dâmbovița, a commune in Dâmboviţa County, and its villages of Valea Lungă-Cricov, Valea Lungă-Gorgota and Valea Lungă-Ogrea
- Valea Lungă, a village in Ilia, Hunedoara
- Valea Lungă, a village in Holboca Commune, Iaşi County
- Valea Lungă, a village in Zalha Commune, Sălaj County
- Valea Lungă, a village in Dârlos Commune, Sibiu County
- Valea Lungă, a village in Stănești, Vâlcea
- Valea Lungă, a village in Vinderei Commune, Vaslui County
- Valea Lungă Română, a village in Coșteiu Commune, Timiș County

and to several rivers in Romania:

- Valea Lungă, a tributary of the Arieșul Mic in Alba County
- Valea Lungă, a tributary of the Bistrița in Gorj County
- Valea Lungă (Ilișua), in Bistrița-Năsăud County
- Valea Lungă, a tributary of the Luncoiu in Hunedoara County
- Valea Lungă, a tributary of the Moneasa in Arad County
- Valea Lungă, a tributary of the Olt in Brașov County
- Valea Lungă, a tributary of the Părău in Brașov County
- Valea Lungă, a tributary of the Răcăciuni in Bacău County
- Valea Lungă, a tributary of the Telcișor in Bistrița-Năsăud County
- Valea Lungă, a tributary of the Roșua in Bistrița-Năsăud County
- Valea Lungă (Târnava Mare), in Alba County
- Valea Lungă, a tributary of the Turcu in Brașov County
- Valea Lungă, a tributary of the Zăvoi in Sibiu County

== See also ==
- Valea (disambiguation)
