= Valea Verde =

Valea Verde may refer to:

- Valea Verde, a village in Grădiniţa Commune, Căuşeni district, Moldova
- Valea Verde, a village in Sohodol Commune, Alba County, Romania

== See also ==
- Valea (disambiguation)
