= Valea Lupului (disambiguation) =

Valea Lupului is a commune in Iaşi County, Romania.

Valea Lupului may also refer to:

- Valea Lupului, a village in Vultureni Commune, Bacău County, Romania
- Valea Lupului, a village administered by Pătârlagele town, Buzău County, Romania
- Valea Lupului, a village in Baru Commune, Hunedoara County, Romania
- Valea Lupului, a village in Gherghești Commune, Vaslui County, Romania

== See also ==
- Valea (disambiguation)
