= Larga =

Larga may refer to several places in Romania:

- Larga (Hungarian: Lárga), a village in Dofteana Commune, Bacău County
- Larga, a village in Samarinești Commune, Gorj County
- Larga, a village in Suciu de Sus Commune, Maramureș County
- Larga (Lárga), a village in Sărmașu town, Mureș County
- Larga, a village in Gurghiu Commune, Mureș County
- Larga, a tributary of the Turbați (Jiu basin)
- Larga, a tributary of the Humor (Siret basin)
- Larga, a tributary of the Lotru (Olt basin)
- Larga, a tributary of the Suciu (Someș basin)
- Larga Mare, a tributary of the Timiș (Olt basin)

two places in Moldova:

- Larga, Briceni, a commune in Briceni district
- Larga, a village in Zolotievca Commune, Anenii Noi district

a species of true seal:

- Larga seal (Phoca largha)

a musical note value in mensural notation, also called the maxima.
