= Valea Satului =

Valea Satului may refer to the following places:

== Populated places ==
- Valea Satului, a village in Dolinnoe commune, Criuleni district, Moldova
- Valea Satului, a village in Grajduri commune, Iași County, Romania
- Valea Satului, a village in Vulpeni commune, Olt County, Romania

== Rivers in Romania ==
- Valea Satului, a tributary of the Axin in Caraș-Severin County
- Valea Satului, a tributary of the Burla in Botoșani County
- Valea Satului, a tributary of the Calva in Sibiu County
- Valea Satului (Crișul Alb), in Hunedoara County
- Valea Satului, a tributary of the Crișul Repede in Bihor and Cluj Counties
- Valea Satului, a tributary of the Danube near Dubova, Mehedinți County
- Valea Satului, a tributary of the Danube near Eșelnița, Mehedinți County
- Valea Satului (Geamărtălui), in Dolj and Olt Counties
- Valea Satului (Iza), in Maramureș County
- Valea Satului, a tributary of the Lotru near Brezoi, Vâlcea County
- Valea Satului, a tributary of the Lotru near Malaia, Vâlcea County
- Valea Satului (Olt), a tributary of the Olt near Câineni, Vâlcea County
- Valea Satului, a tributary of the Olt near Jiblea, Vâlcea County
- Valea Satului, a tributary of the Rebra in Bistrița-Năsăud County
- Valea Satului, a tributary of the Suhu in Galați County
- Valea Satului, a tributary of the Tău in Caraș-Severin County
- Valea Satului, a tributary of the Topolog in Argeș County

== See also ==
- Valea (disambiguation)
