= Valea Perjei =

Valea Perjei may refer to:

- Valea Perjei, Cimişlia, Moldova
- Valea Perjei, Taraclia, Moldova

== See also ==
- Valea (disambiguation)
