= Văleni =

Văleni or Vălenii may refer to several places in Romania:

- Văleni-Dâmbovița
- Vălenii de Munte, a town in Prahova County
- Văleni, Neamț, a commune in Neamț County
- Văleni, Olt, a commune in Olt County
- Văleni, Vaslui, a commune in Vaslui County
- Văleni, a village in Bucium Commune, Alba County
- Văleni, a village in Meteș Commune, Alba County
- Văleni, a village in Sălătrucu Commune, Argeș County
- Văleni, a village in Parincea Commune, Bacău County
- Văleni, a village in Secuieni Commune, Bacău County
- Văleni, a village in Stănișești Commune, Bacău County
- Văleni, a village in Jibert Commune, Brașov County
- Văleni, a village in Căianu Commune, Cluj County
- Văleni, a village in Călățele Commune, Cluj County
- Văleni, a village in Dobromir Commune, Constanța County
- Văleni, a village in Plopșoru Commune, Gorj County
- Văleni, a village in Feliceni Commune, Harghita County
- Văleni, a district in the town of Geoagiu, Hunedoara County
- Văleni, a village in Baia de Criș Commune, Hunedoara County
- Vălenii, a village in Țibănești Commune, Iași County
- Văleni, a village in Călinești Commune, Maramureș County
- Vălenii Lăpușului, a village in Coroieni Commune, Maramureș County
- Vălenii Șomcutei, a district in the town of Șomcuta Mare, Maramureș County
- Vălenii, a village in Acățari Commune, Mureș County
- Vălenii de Mureș, a village in the commune Brâncovenești, Mureș County
- Văleni, a village in Pogăceaua Commune, Mureș County
- Văleni, a district in the city of Piatra Neamț, Neamț County
- Văleni, a village in Botești Commune, Neamț County
- Văleni, a village in Brâncoveni Commune, Olt County
- Văleni, a village in Cristolț Commune, Sălaj County
- Văleni, a village in Micăsasa Commune, Sibiu County
- Văleni, a village in Păușești Commune, Vâlcea County
- Văleni, Dealu Văleni and Valea Văleni, villages in Zătreni Commune, Vâlcea County
- Văleni, a village in Pădureni Commune, Vaslui County
- Văleni, a village in Viișoara Commune, Vaslui County
- Văleni, a village in Movilița Commune, Vrancea County
- Văleni, a village in Ruginești Commune, Vrancea County
- Văleni, a village in Străoane Commune, Vrancea County

a place in Moldova:

- Văleni, Cahul, a commune in Cahul District

several rivers in Romania:

- Văleni (Arieș), a tributary of the Arieș in Cluj County
- Văleni, a tributary of the Câlneș in Neamț County
- Văleni, another name of the Cozd, tributary of the Homorod in Brașov County
- Văleni (Iza), a tributary of the Iza in Maramureș County

== See also ==
- Valea (disambiguation)
