= Borcut =

Borcut may refer to the following places in Romania:

- Borcut, a village in the town Târgu Lăpuș, Maramureș County
- Borcut (Săsar), a river in Maramureș County
- Borcut, a tributary of the Someșul Mare in Bistrița-Năsăud County
