= Sângeorz-Băi =

- Town
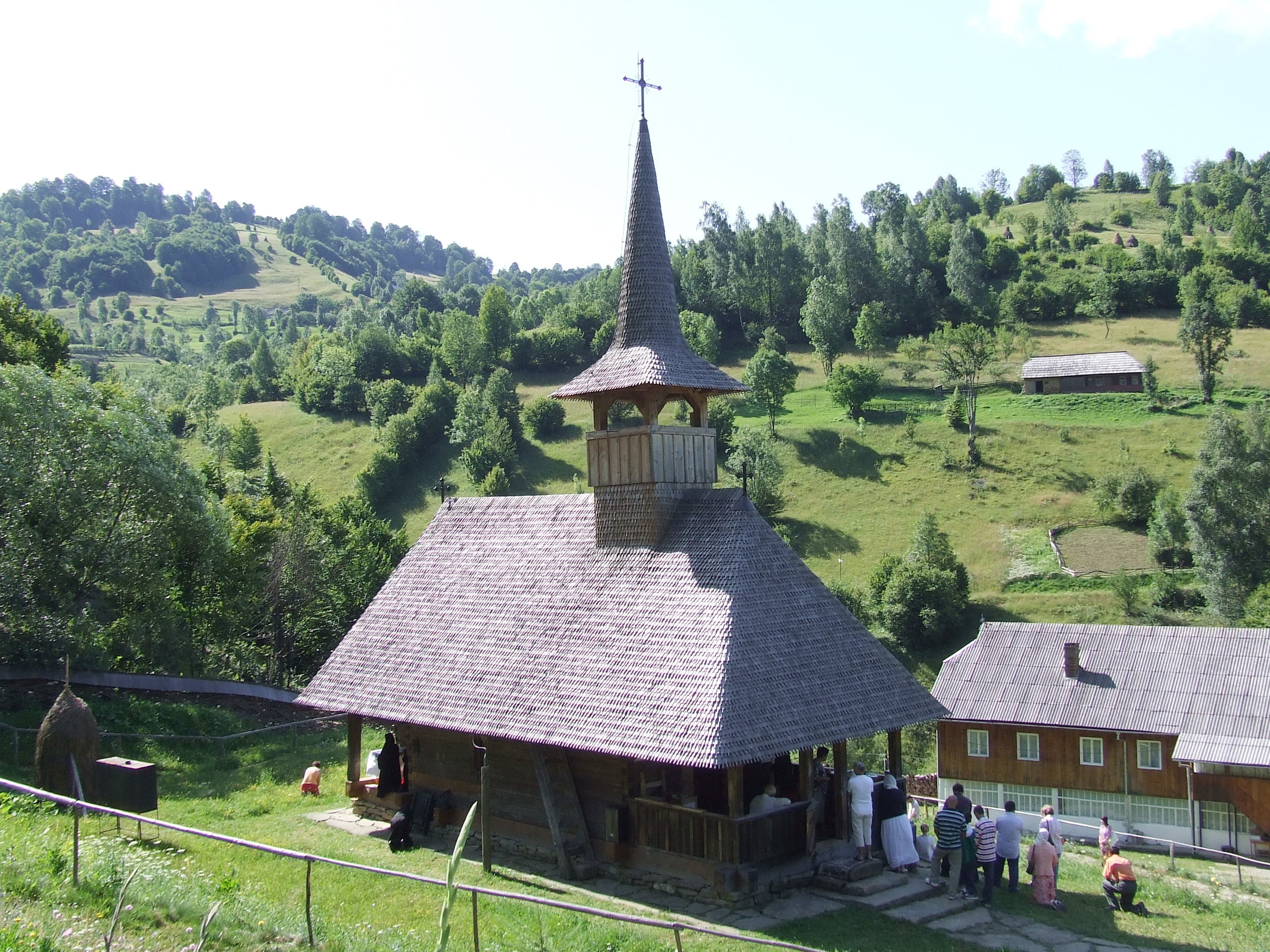
- Wooden church in Sângeorz-Băi

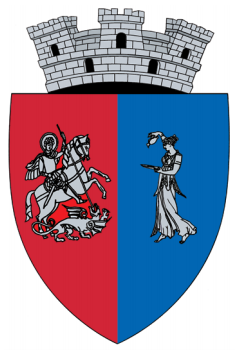
- Coat of arms

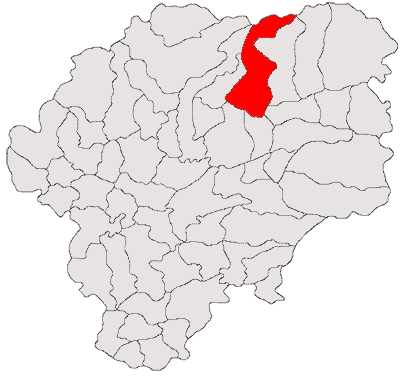
- Location in Bistrița-Năsăud County

- Location in Romania
- Coordinates: 47°22′12″N 24°40′48″E
- Country: Romania
- County: Bistrița-Năsăud

Government
  - Mayor (2024–2028): Cătălin-Grigore Bota (PNL)
- Area: 146.82 km^{2} (56.69 sq mi)
- Elevation: 446 m (1,463 ft)
- Population (2021-12-01): 10,931
  - Density: 74.452/km^{2} (192.83/sq mi)
- Time zone: UTC+02:00 (EET)
  - Summer (DST): UTC+03:00 (EEST)
- Postal code: 425300
- Area code: (+40) 02 63
- Vehicle reg.: BN
- Website: www.singeorzbai.com

Sângeorz-Băi (also spelled Sîngeorz-Băi, Romanian pronunciation: [sɨnˈd͡ʒe̯orz bəj]; formerly Sângiorgiul Român; Hungarian: Oláhszentgyörgy or Naszódszentgyörgy; German: Sankt Georgen or Rumänisch Sanktgeorgen or Georgenau; Transylvanian Saxon: Gergn; Sänt-Jorich, Sänt-Gergn, Gergnâ) is a spa resort and town in the mountain region of Bistrița-Năsăud County in Transylvania, Romania.

The town administers two villages, Cormaia (Kormája, Karmajadűlő) and Valea Borcutului (Borpatak; German: Sauerbrunn).

== Geography ==
The town is situated on the northeastern edge of the Transylvanian Plateau, at the foot of the Rodna Mountains, partly within the Rodna Mountains National Park. It lies on the banks of the river Someșul Mare; the river Cormaia discharges into the Someșul Mare a short distance upstream.

Sângeorz-Băi is located in the northern part of the county, on the border with Maramureș County. It lies at a distance of 30 km (19 mi) from Năsăud, and 40 km (25 mi) from the county seat, Bistrița. The town is traversed by national road DN17 (part of European route E58), which joins Dej in Cluj County to Suceava.

== Demographics ==
Historical population
Year	Pop.	±%
1966	6,693	—
1977	8,243	+23.2%
1992	10,280	+24.7%
2002	10,702	+4.1%
2011	9,679	−9.6%
2021	10,931	+12.9%
Source: Census data

At the 2021 census, Sângeorz-Băi had a population of 10,931. At the 2002 census, 97.8% of inhabitants were Romanians, 1.5% Roma and 0.5% Hungarians; 73.1% were Romanian Orthodox, 19.7% Pentecostal, and 5.9% Greek-Catholic.

== Education ==
The town is the home of the Solomon Haliță Theoretical High School.

== Natives ==
- Ion Al-George (1891–1957), writer
- Gabi Balint (born 1963), footballer
- Maria Rus (born 1983), sprinter
