= Cormaia =

- Location within Romania

Location
- Country: Romania
- Counties: Bistrița-Năsăud County
- Villages: Cormaia, Sângeorz-Băi

Physical characteristics
- Source: Rodna Mountains, Mount Repede
  - coordinates: 47°32′40″N 24°38′27″E
  - elevation: 1,527 m (5,010 ft)
- Mouth: Someșul Mare
  - location: Sângeorz-Băi
  - coordinates: 47°22′51″N 24°41′52″E
  - elevation: 452 m (1,483 ft)
- Length: 21 km (13 mi)
- Basin size: 102 km^{2} (39 sq mi)

Basin features
- Progression: Someșul Mare→ Someș→ Tisza→ Danube→ Black Sea
- Tributaries
  - left: Valea Vinului
  - right: Măgura

The Cormaia is a right tributary of the river Someșul Mare in Romania. It discharges into the Someșul Mare 1 km (1 mi) upstream from Sângeorz-Băi. Its length is 21 km (13 mi) and its basin size is 102 km^{2} (39 sq mi).
