= Valea Largă (disambiguation) =

Valea Largă may refer to several places in Romania:

- Valea Largă, a commune in Mureș County
- Valea Largă, a village in Sălciua Commune, Alba County
- Valea Largă, a village in Buda Commune, Buzău County
- Valea Largă, a village in Pucheni Commune, Dâmbovița County
- Valea Largă, a village in Valea Călugărească Commune, Prahova County
- Valea Largă-Sărulești, a village in Sărulești Commune, Buzău County
- Valea Largă (Arieș), a tributary of the Arieș in Cluj County
- Valea Largă, a tributary of the Dâmbovița in Argeș County
- Valea Largă (Dâmbovița), a tributary of the Dâmbovița in Dâmbovița County
- Valea Largă, a tributary of the Olt in Vâlcea County
- Valea Largă, a tributary of the Orăștie in Hunedoara County
- Valea Largă, a tributary of the Prahova in Prahova County
- Valea Largă, a tributary of the Râul Târgului in Argeș County
- Valea Largă, a tributary of the Secaș in Alba County
- Valea Largă, a tributary of the Vasilatu in Vâlcea County

== See also ==
- Valea (disambiguation)
