= Vinu =

Vinu is both a Tamil and Malayali surname and a given name. Notable people with the name include:

- Ajayan Vinu (born 1976), material scientist
- V. M. Vinu (born 1968), Indian film director
- Vinu Abraham, Indian writer
- Vinu Chakravarthy (1945–2017), Indian actor, screenwriter, and director
- Vinu Mohan (born 1986), Indian actor
