= Humor (Moldova) =

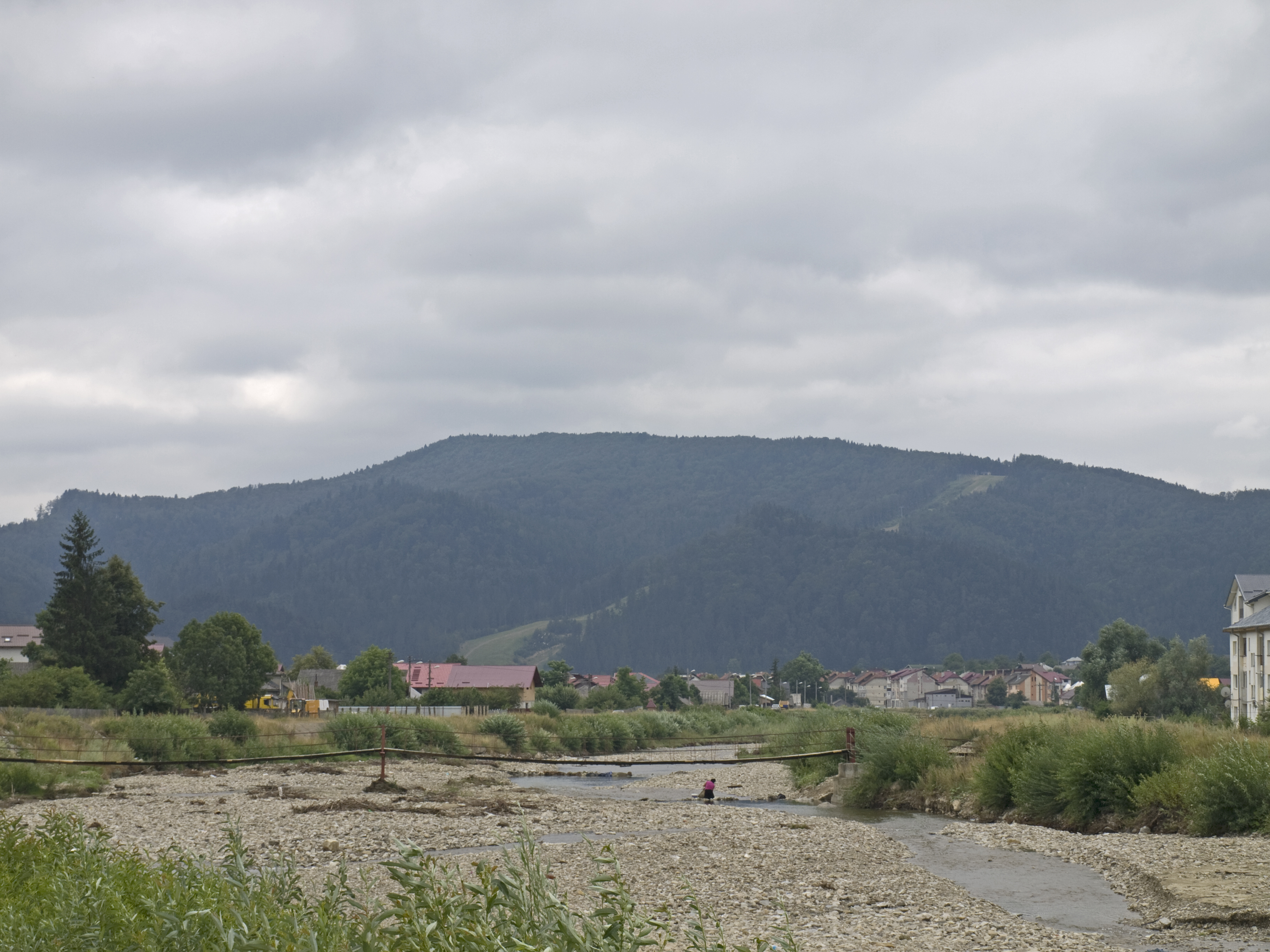
- The Humor in Gura Humorului

- Location within Romania

Location
- Country: Romania
- Counties: Suceava County
- Villages: Poiana Micului, Mănăstirea Humorului, Gura Humorului

Physical characteristics
- Mouth: Moldova
  - location: Gura Humorului
  - coordinates: 47.5476°N 25.8944°E
- Length: 26 km (16 mi)
- Basin size: 106 km^{2} (41 sq mi)

Basin features
- Progression: Moldova→ Siret→ Danube→ Black Sea
- Tributaries
  - right: Larga

The Humor is a left tributary of the river Moldova in Romania. It discharges into the Moldova in Gura Humorului. Its length is 26 km (16 mi) and its basin size is 106 km^{2} (41 sq mi).
