= Gura Humorului =

- Town
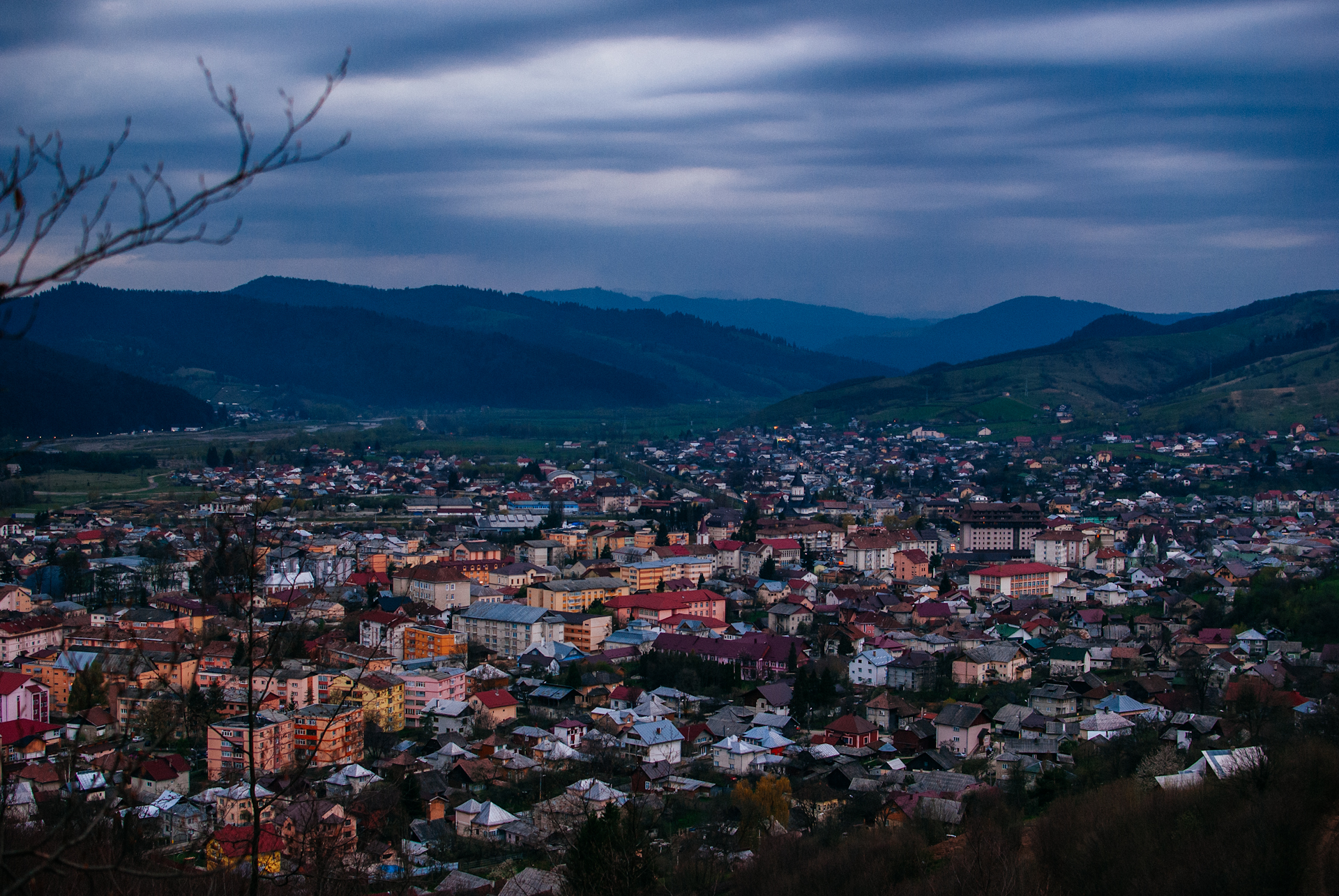
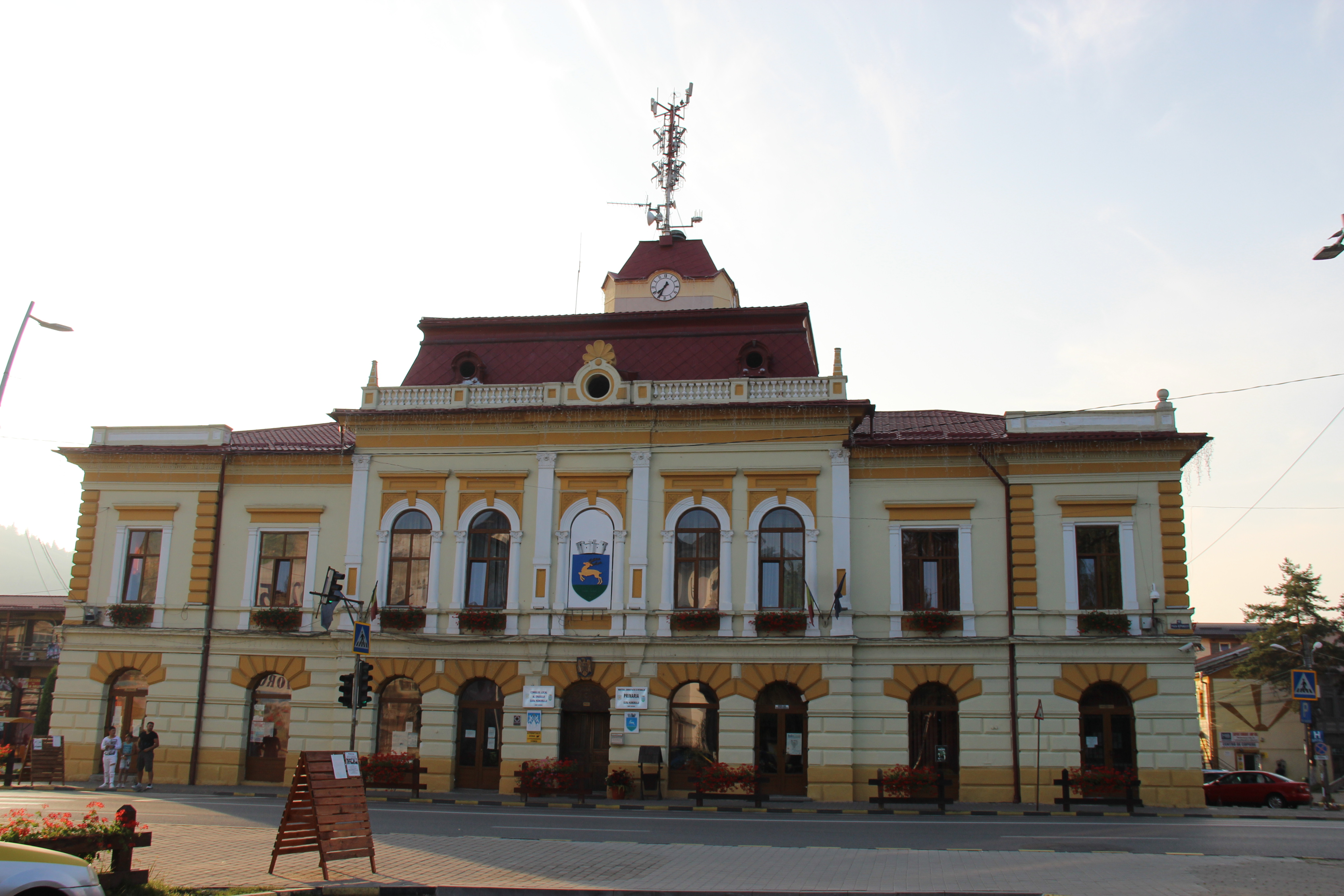
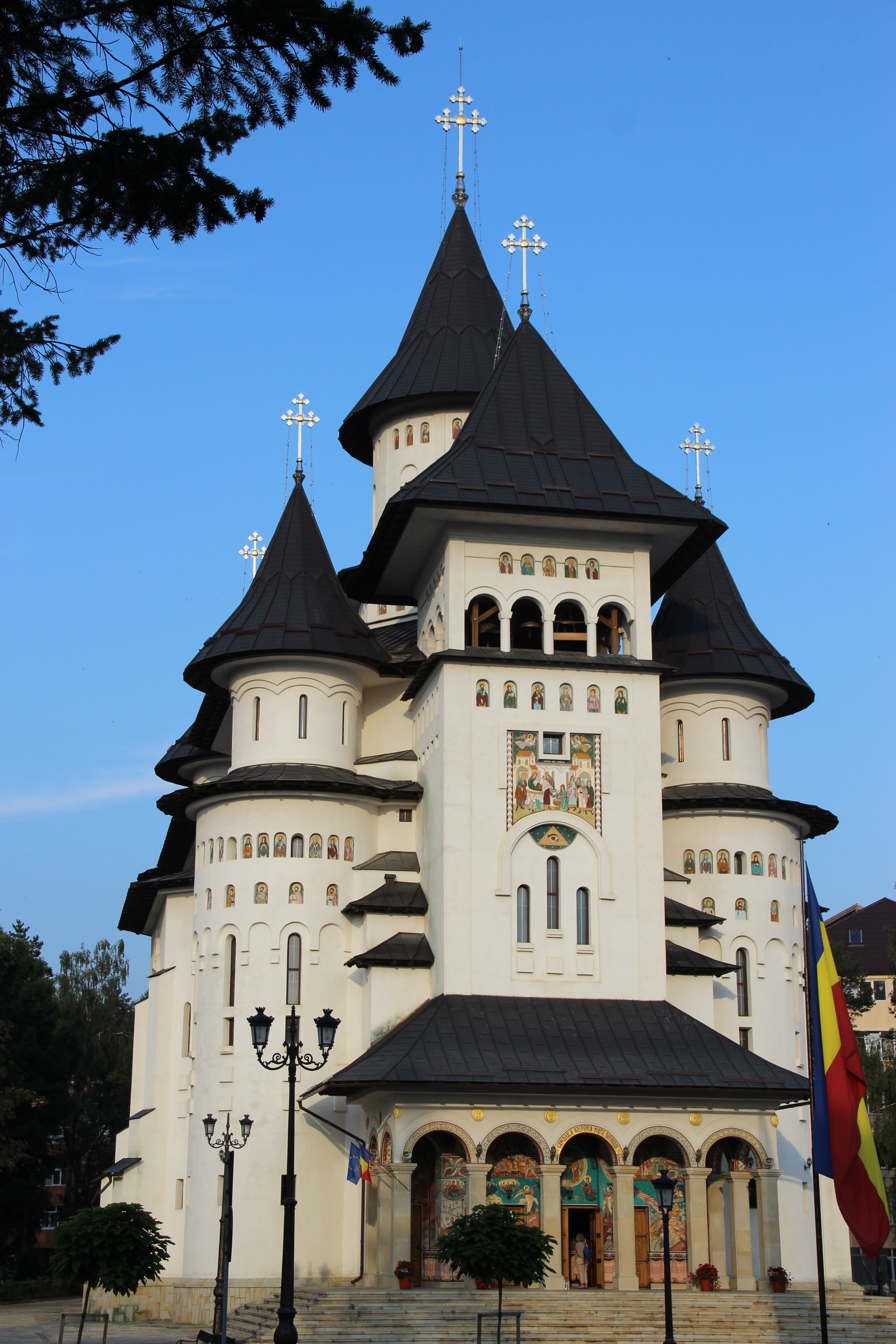
- Panorama Town Hall Cathedral

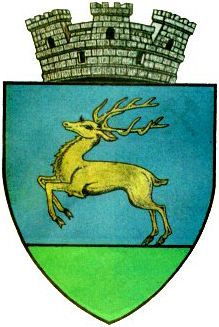
- Coat of arms

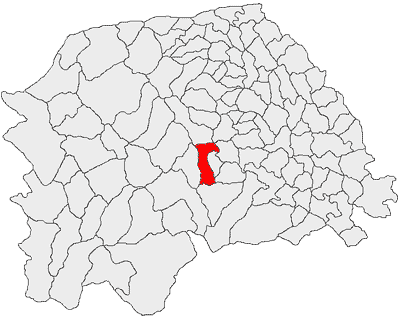
- Location in Suceava County

- Location in Romania
- Coordinates: 47°33′14″N 25°53′21″E
- Country: Romania
- County: Suceava

Government
  - Mayor (2024–2028): Marius Ioan Ursaciuc (Ind.)
- Area: 60.90 km^{2} (23.51 sq mi)
- Elevation: 470 m (1,540 ft)
- Population (2021-12-01): 13,278
  - Density: 218.0/km^{2} (564.7/sq mi)
- Time zone: UTC+02:00 (EET)
  - Summer (DST): UTC+03:00 (EEST)
- Postal code: 725300
- Area code: (+40) 02 30
- Vehicle reg.: SV
- Website: www.primariagh.ro

Gura Humorului (Romanian pronunciation: [ˌɡura huˈmoruluj]; Hebrew and Yiddish: גורה חומורולוי - Gure Humuruluei or גורא הומאָרא - Gura Humora; German and Polish: Gura Humora or Gurahumora) is a town in Suceava County, northeastern Romania. It is situated in the historical regions of Bukovina and Western Moldavia.

Gura Humorului is the seventh largest urban settlement in the county, with a population of 13,278 inhabitants, according to the 2021 census. It was declared a town in 1904 and it became a resort in 2005. The town administers the former village of Voroneț (which became a neighborhood), site of Voroneț Monastery.

== Administration and local politics ==
=== Town council ===
The town's former local council had the following political composition, according to the results of the 2020 local elections:

Party	Seats	Current Council
National Liberal Party (PNL)	10	
Save Romania Union (USR)	3	
Social Democratic Party (PSD)	3	
PRO Romania (PRO)	1	

The town's current local council has the following political composition, according to the results of the 2024 local elections:

Party	Seats	Current Council
National Liberal Party (PNL)	8	
Social Democratic Party (PSD)	6	
Alliance for the Union of Romanians (AUR)	2	
Save Romania Union (USR)	1	

== Geography ==
Gura Humorului is located in the north-eastern part of Romania, in southern Bukovina. The town is situated at the eastern limit of Obcinele Bucovinei Mountains, in Humorului Depression, at the confluence of Moldova River and Humor River. The average altitude of the town is 470 metres (1,540 ft). The European route E58 and the Suceava–Vatra Dornei railway pass through the town. Suceava, the county capital, is located 34 kilometres (21 miles) away. The town of Frasin is located nearby Gura Humorului (only 7 km (4.3 mi) away).

== Demographics ==
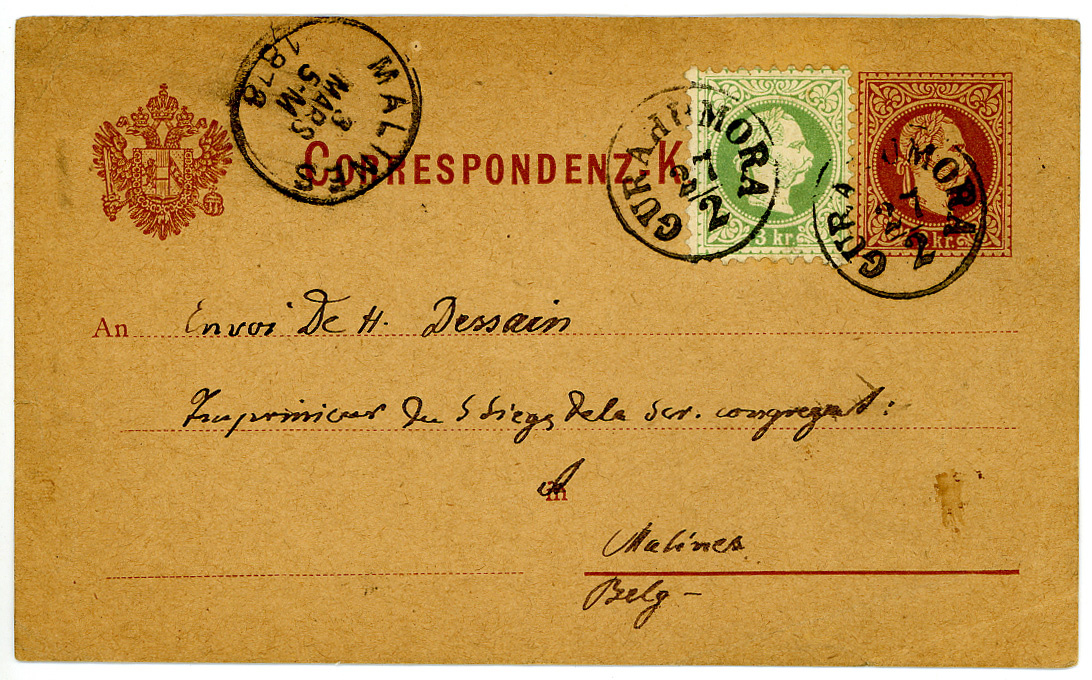
Austrian KK postal card mailed from Gurahumora in 1878.

According to the 1775 Austrian census of Bukovina, its population comprised only about 60,000 spread over 10,422 square kilometres (4,024 sq mi). In order to encourage the development of this sparsely settled land, the authorities subsidized the immigration of colonists to Bukovina. With the end of the first wave of settlement, colonists were to continue arriving at their own expense. As a result of these policies, the census of 1910 showed that the population had risen to over 800,000. People of many different ethnic groups took part in this immigration, including Germans, Rusyns, Hungarians, Ukrainians, Poles, Romanians, and Jews.

Historical population
Year	Pop.	±%
1910	5,308	—
1930	6,042	+13.8%
1948	4,573	−24.3%
1956	7,216	+57.8%
1966	9,081	+25.8%
1977	13,235	+45.7%
1992	16,629	+25.6%
2002	15,656	−5.9%
2011	13,667	−12.7%
2021	13,278	−2.8%
Source: Austrian and Romanian census data and/or official estimates

In 1992, Gura Humorului had a population of about 17,000 inhabitants were living within the town limits. As of 2016, the town's population surpassed this limit by a very slim margin.

According to the 2011 census data, Gura Humorului had a total population of 13,667 inhabitants: 97.03% were ethnic Romanians, 1.79% Roma, 0.52% Germans (Bukovina Germans), 0.27% Poles, 0.12% Ukrainians, 0.10% Hungarians, and 0.07% Russians (including Lipovans).

Gura Humorului is the seventh most populated urban locality in Suceava County and the second most populated locality with the status of town (after Vicovu de Sus).

== History ==
Between 1774 and 1918, Gura Humorului belonged to the Habsburg monarchy. During World War I, Bukovina became a battlefield between Austria opposing Russian and Romanian troops. Although the Russians were finally driven out in 1917, defeated Austria would cede the Bukovina province to Romania through the Treaty of Saint-Germain (1919).

== Jewish history of Gura Humorului ==
No Jews lived in Gura Humorului before 1835, when they were allowed to settle, joining other, already represented, ethnic groups (such as Germans from Bohemia, mainly from the Böhmerwald: thirty families settled on the mountainous and densely forested lands nearby the town, establishing a quarter named Bori). The Jewish community began to flourish in 1869, when they formed around a third of the town's population (880 people); the same year, a Beth midrash was established.

A turning point in the town's history was the disastrous fire of May 11, 1899 which destroyed most of the town, more than 400 houses, including many Jewish businesses and homes. It was rebuilt with donations from American Jewish communities. The Jewish community in Gura Humorului continued to grow, reaching 1,951 members in 1927.

Jewish cultural life reached its peak during the interwar period. The languages of choice in the town life were Yiddish, German, and Romanian. Most of the Jewish community adhered to Orthodox Judaism, and Jewish youngsters studied the Torah along with secular subjects such as geography, history, and mathematics. The community had established Jewish social and political institutions that contributed to all fields of public life.

While persecutions began to increase under the threats posed by Romanian fascist movements such as the Iron Guard, it was World War II that brought an end to Jewish presence in Gura Humorului. Under the dictatorship of Ion Antonescu, Jews were rounded up and deported to Transnistria, where many of them perished – mass murdered through various means, including shootings and criminal negligence (see Holocaust in Romania). Virtually all of the Jewish community in Gura Humorului was deported: 2,945 people were all transported on October 10, 1941. According to The Encyclopedia of Jewish Life Before and During the Holocaust, "On 10 Oct. 1941, the J. pop. (2,900) was deported to Transnistria, but on 14 March 1944, 1,500 were allowed to return." On March 14, 1944, Romania's military dictator Ion Antonescu allowed the repatriation of all the Jews deported to Transnistria. The vast majority of survivors emigrated to Israel in 1947–1951. Statistics show that they numbered below 500 people in all at the time of their departure.

== Twin towns – sister cities ==
- Marly-le-Roi, France
- Puck, Poland
- Sulina, Romania

== Natives ==
- Andreea Boghian - rower
- Nathan Juran - American film director
- Olha Kobylianska - Ukrainian-German writer
- Viorel Lucaci - rugby player
- Mihai Macovei - rugby player
- Rixi Markus - bridge player
- Vlad Nistor - rugby player
- Daniel Plai - rugby player
- Victor Săhleanu - physician and anthropologist
- Dorin Semeghin - footballer
- Cătălin Țăranu - professional go player (5 Dan)
- Salomon Wininger - biographer

== Gallery ==
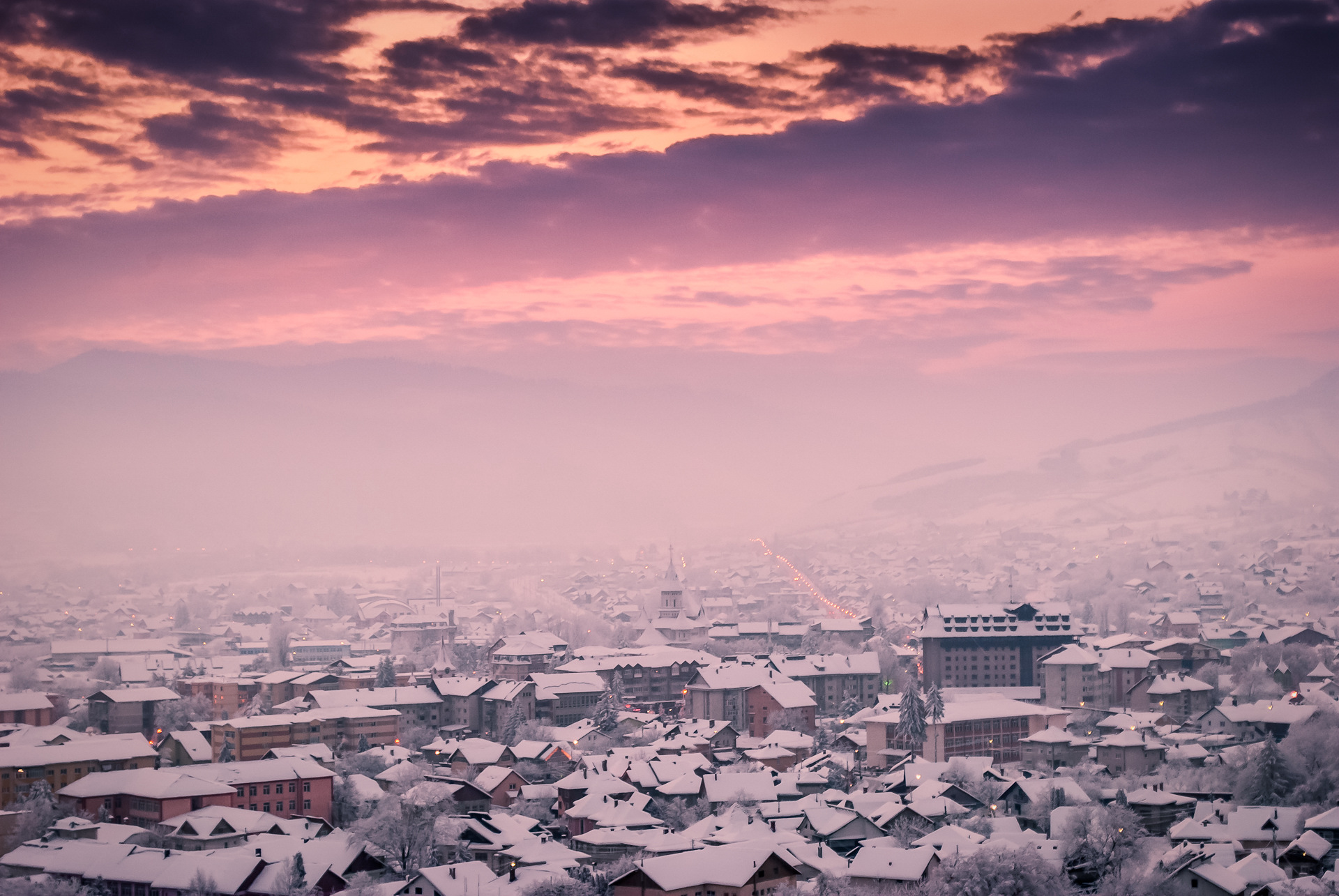
Panoramic view of the town

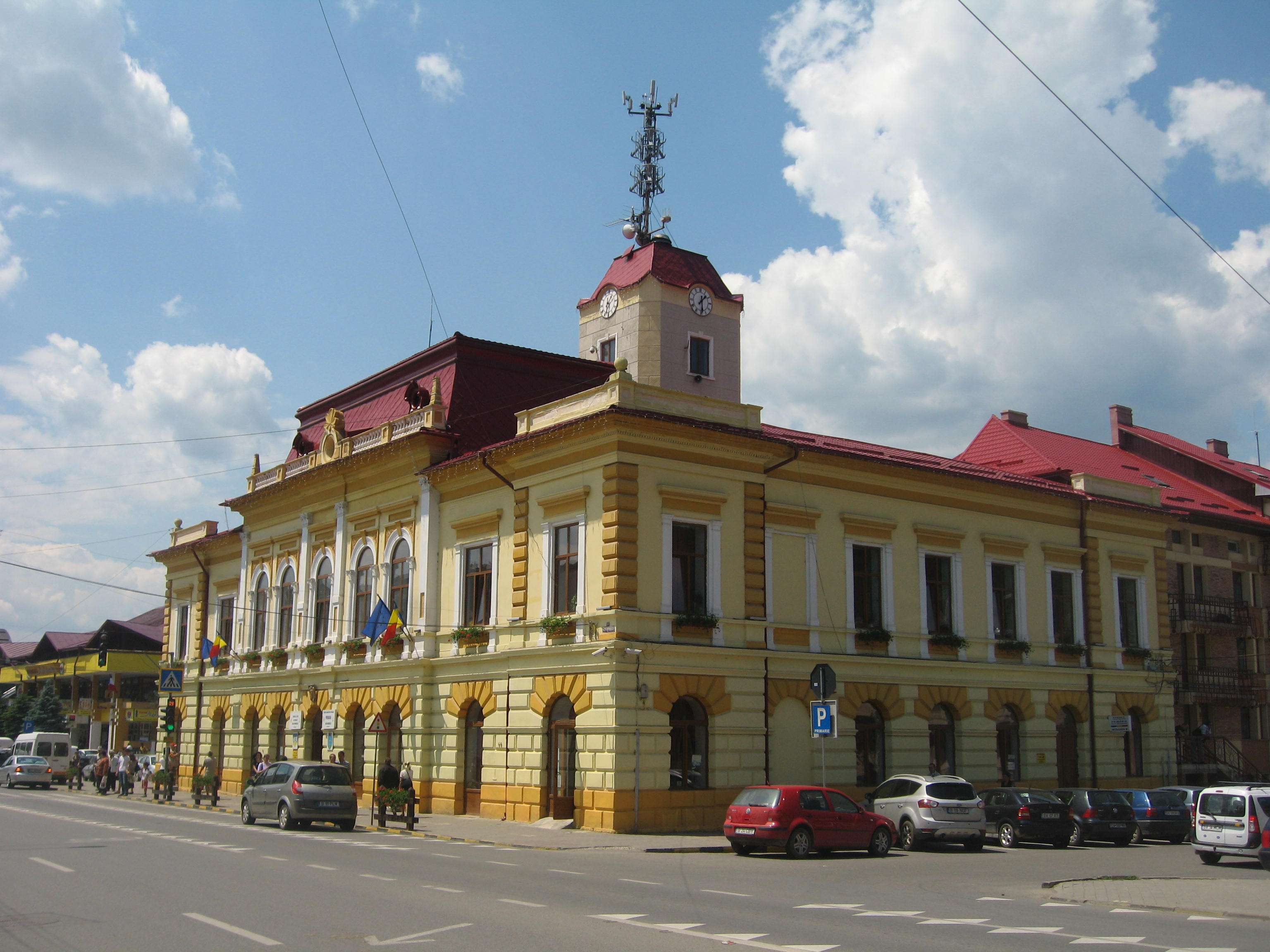
The Town Hall

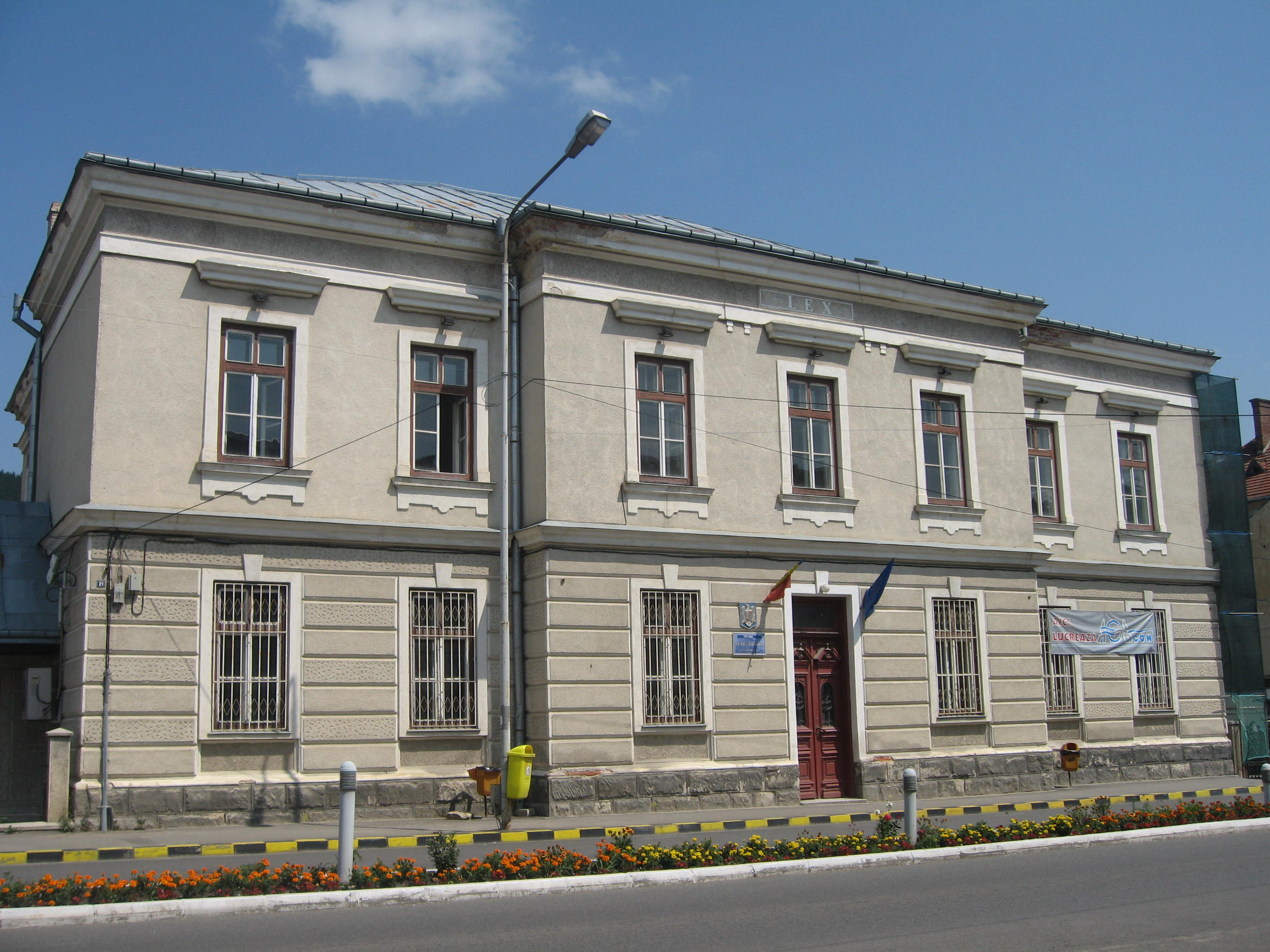
The Town Court

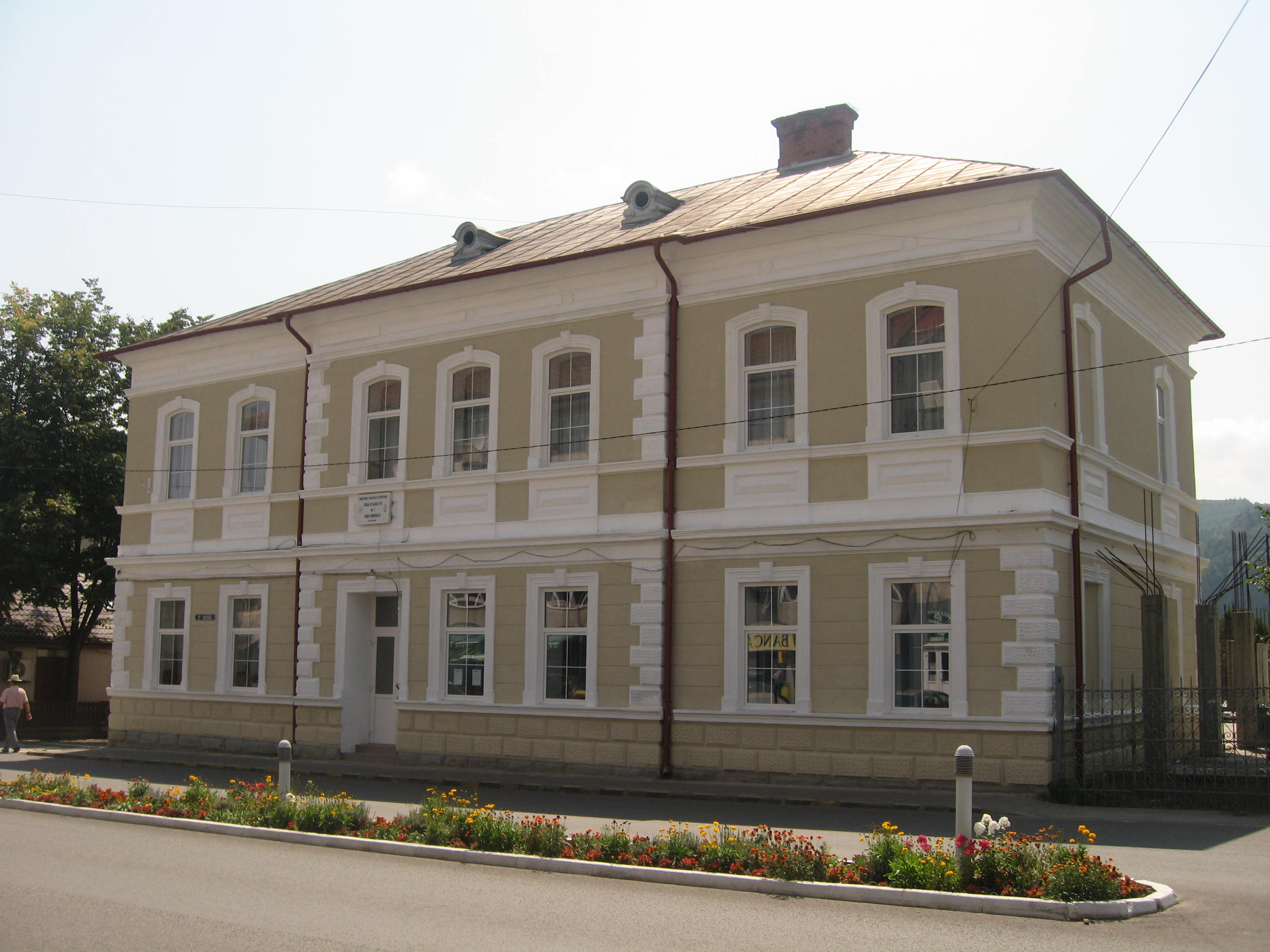
School No. 1

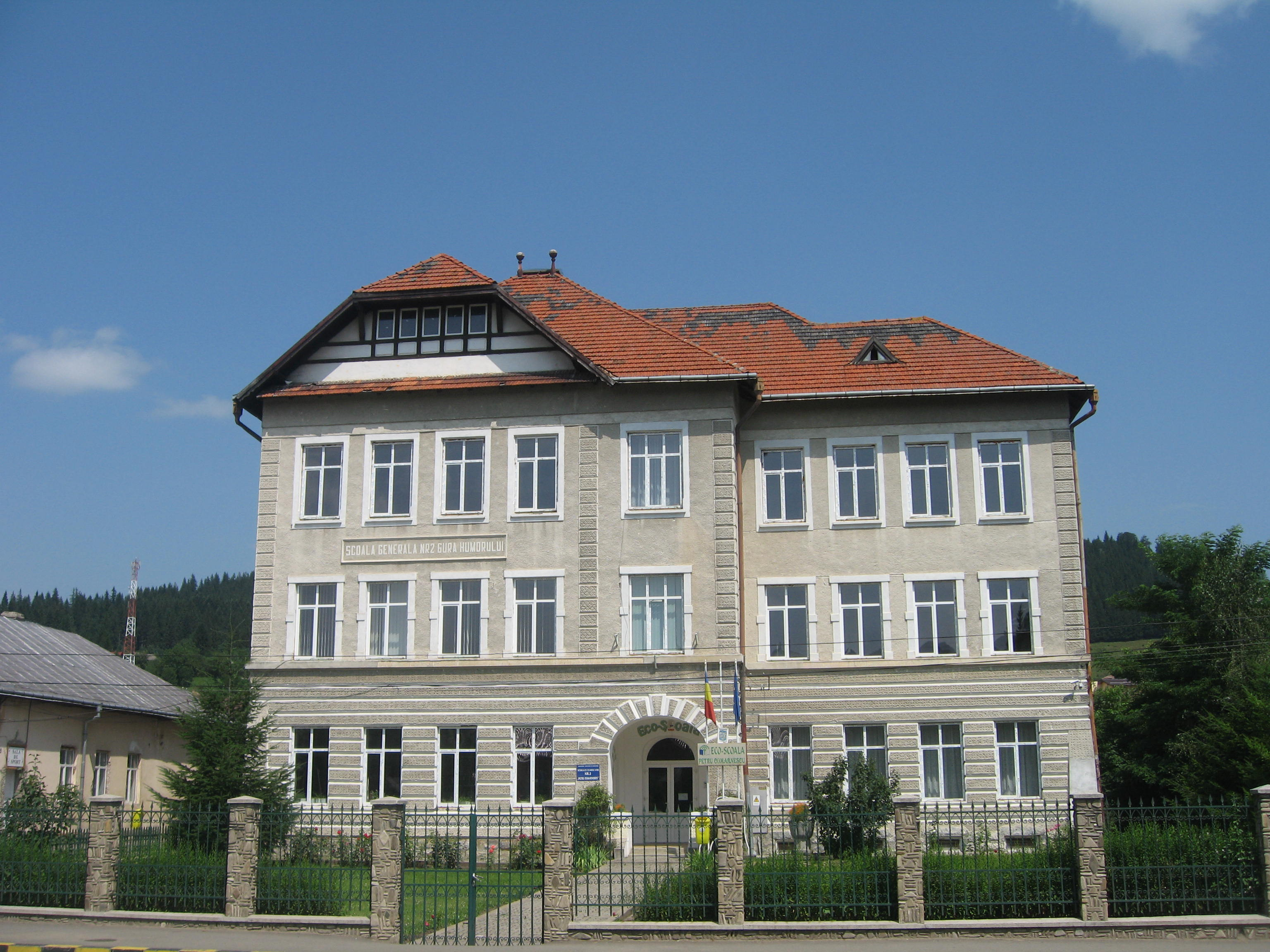
School No. 2

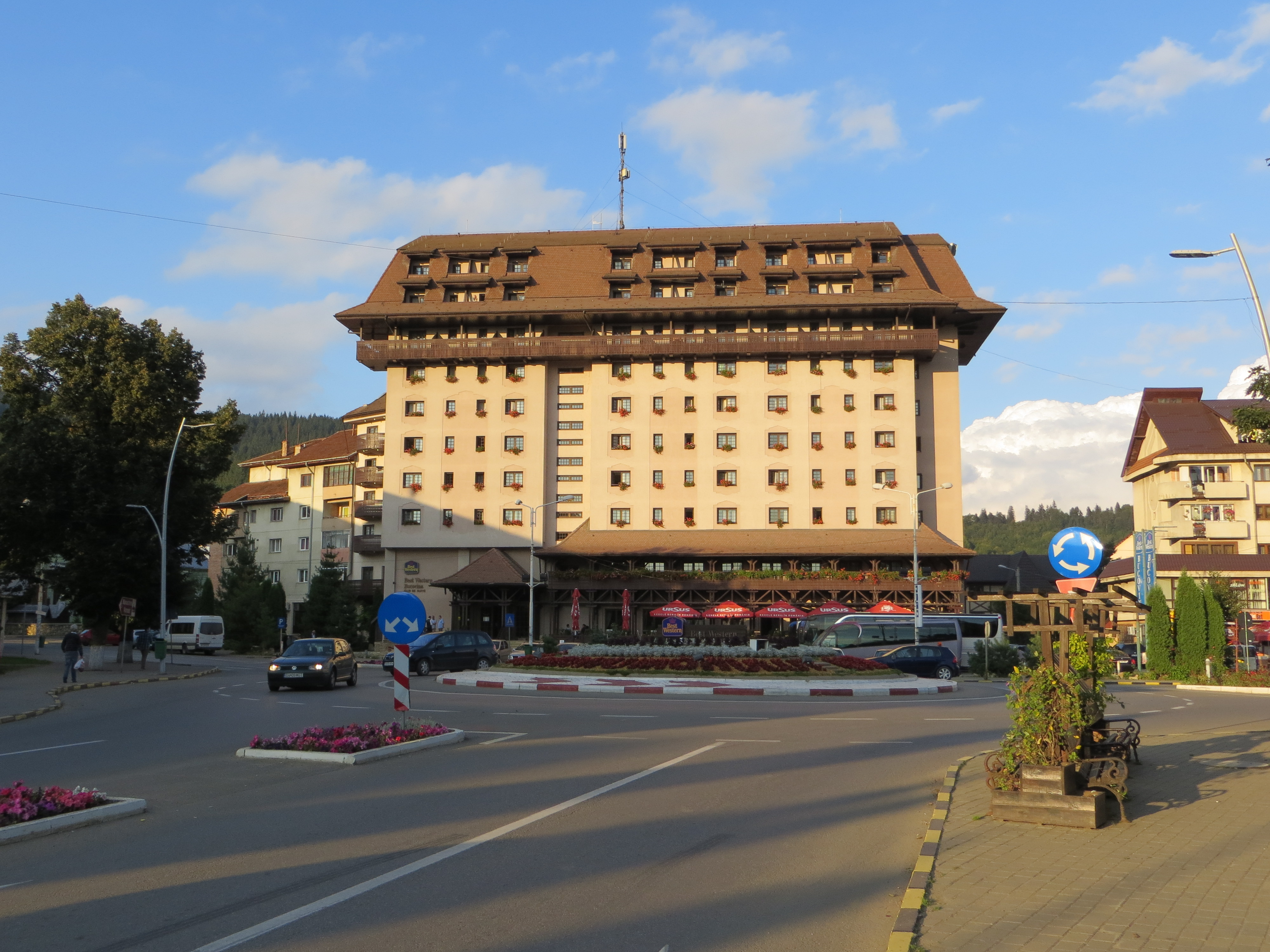
Hotel Bucovina

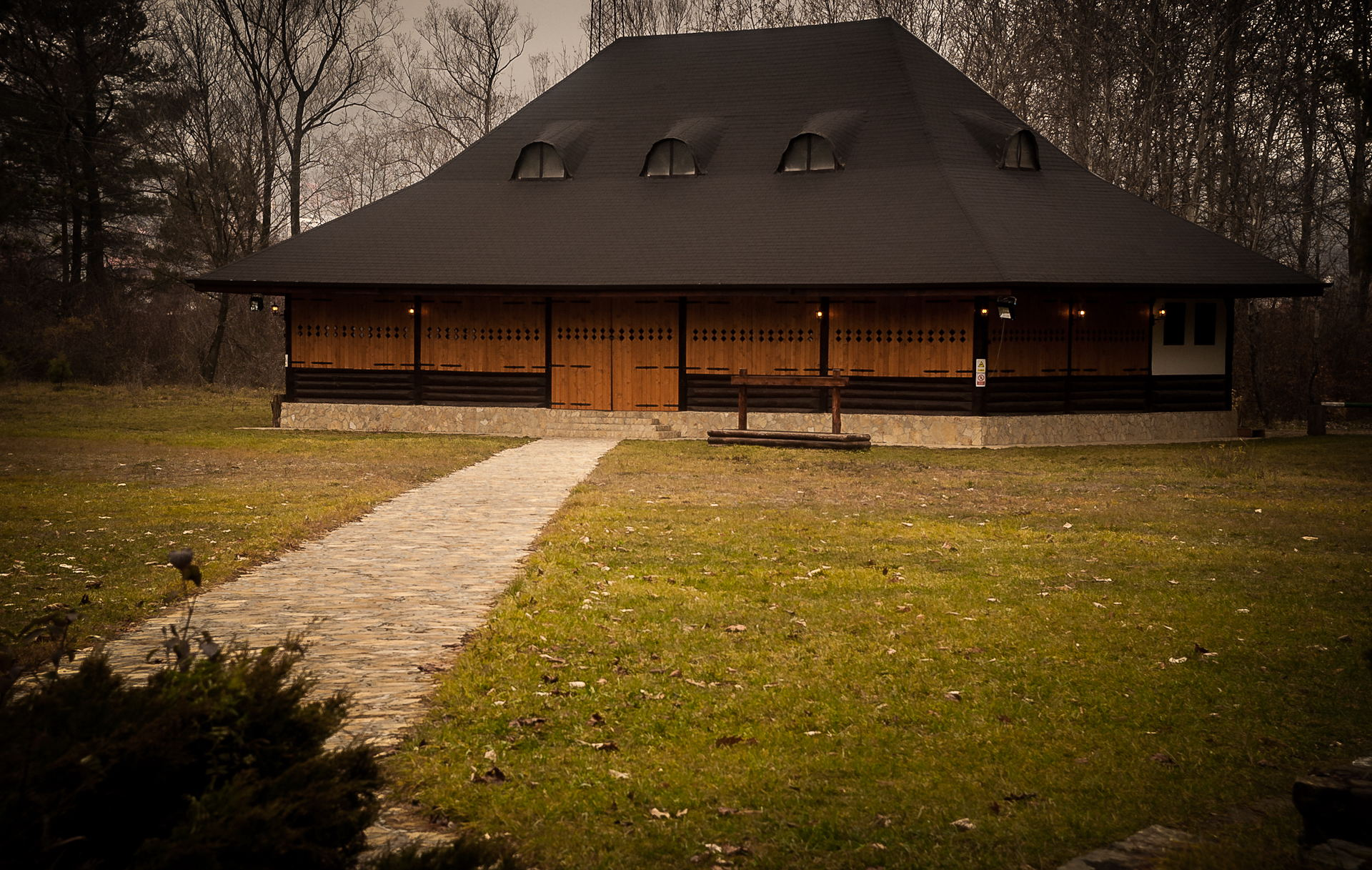
Traditional Romanian wooden house

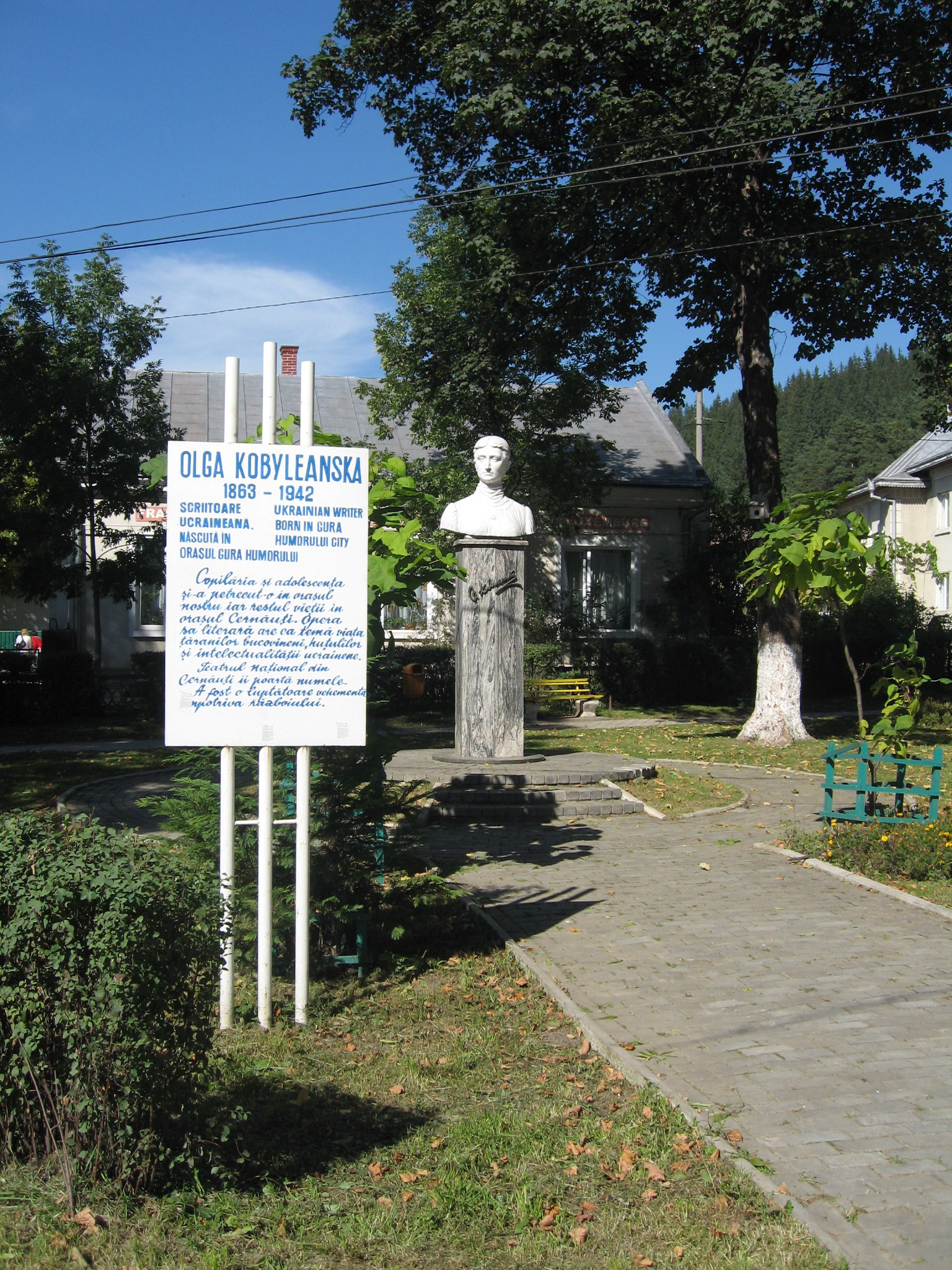
Olha Kobylianska Statue

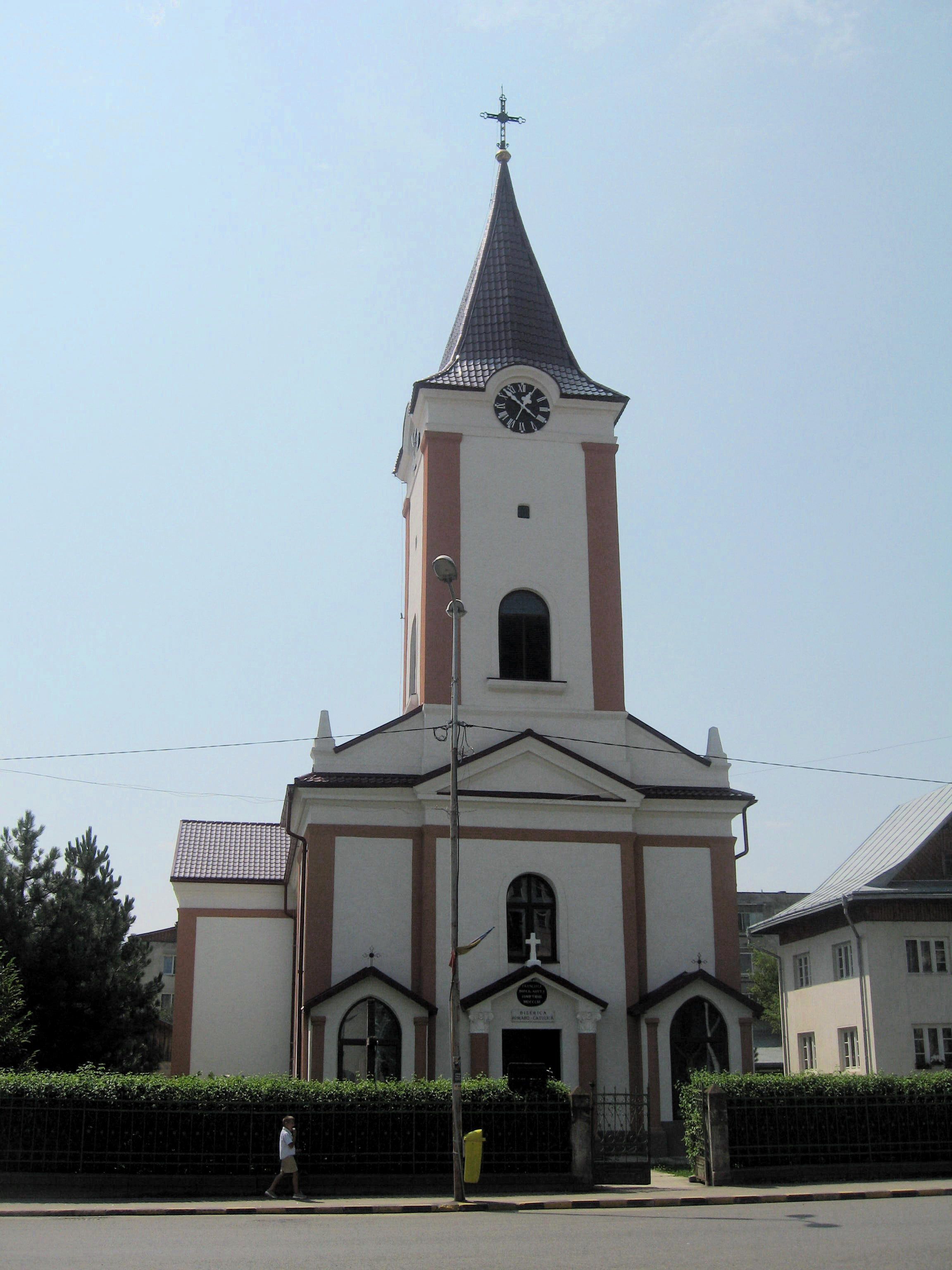
The Roman Catholic Church

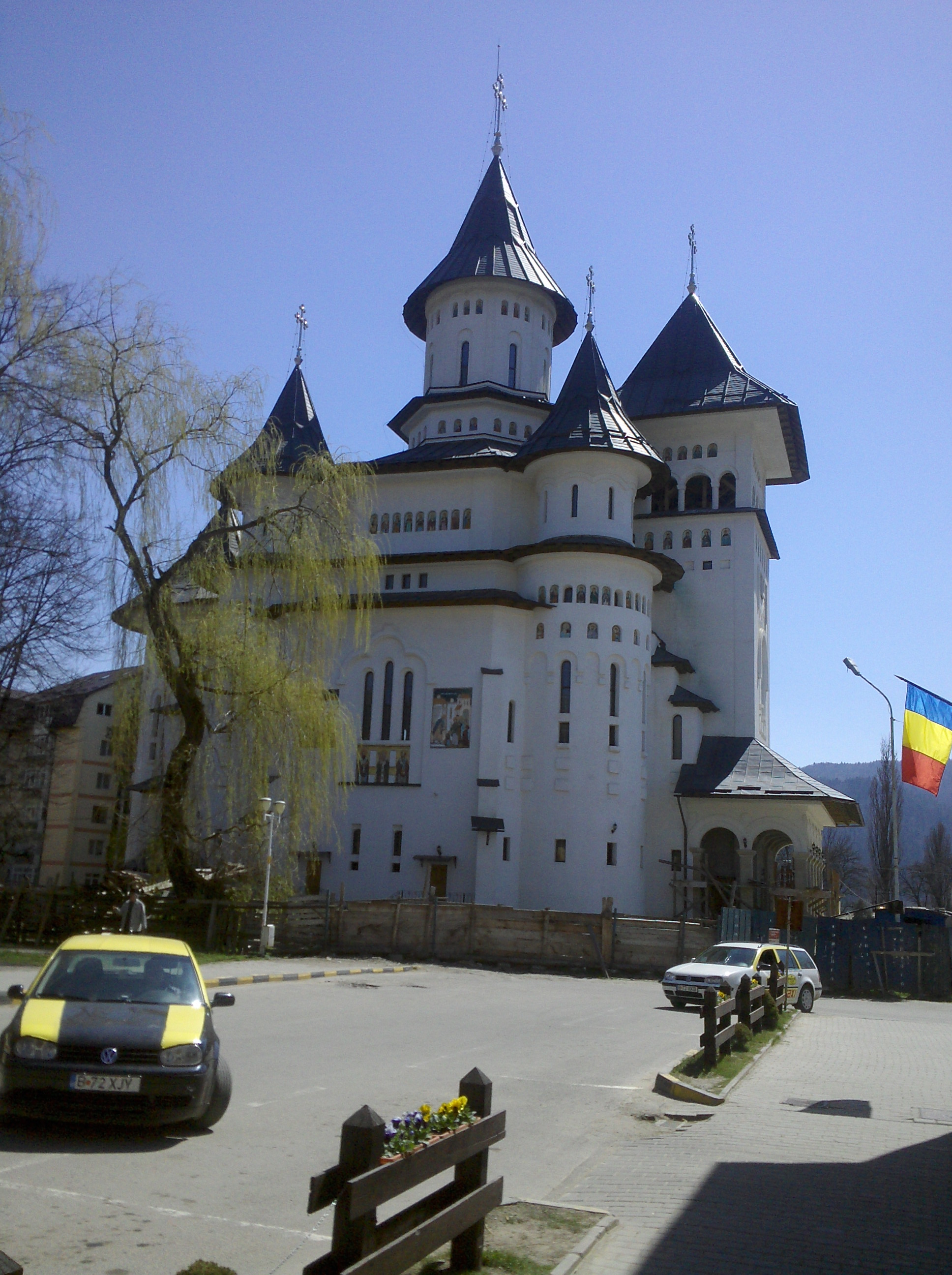
The Orthodox Cathedral

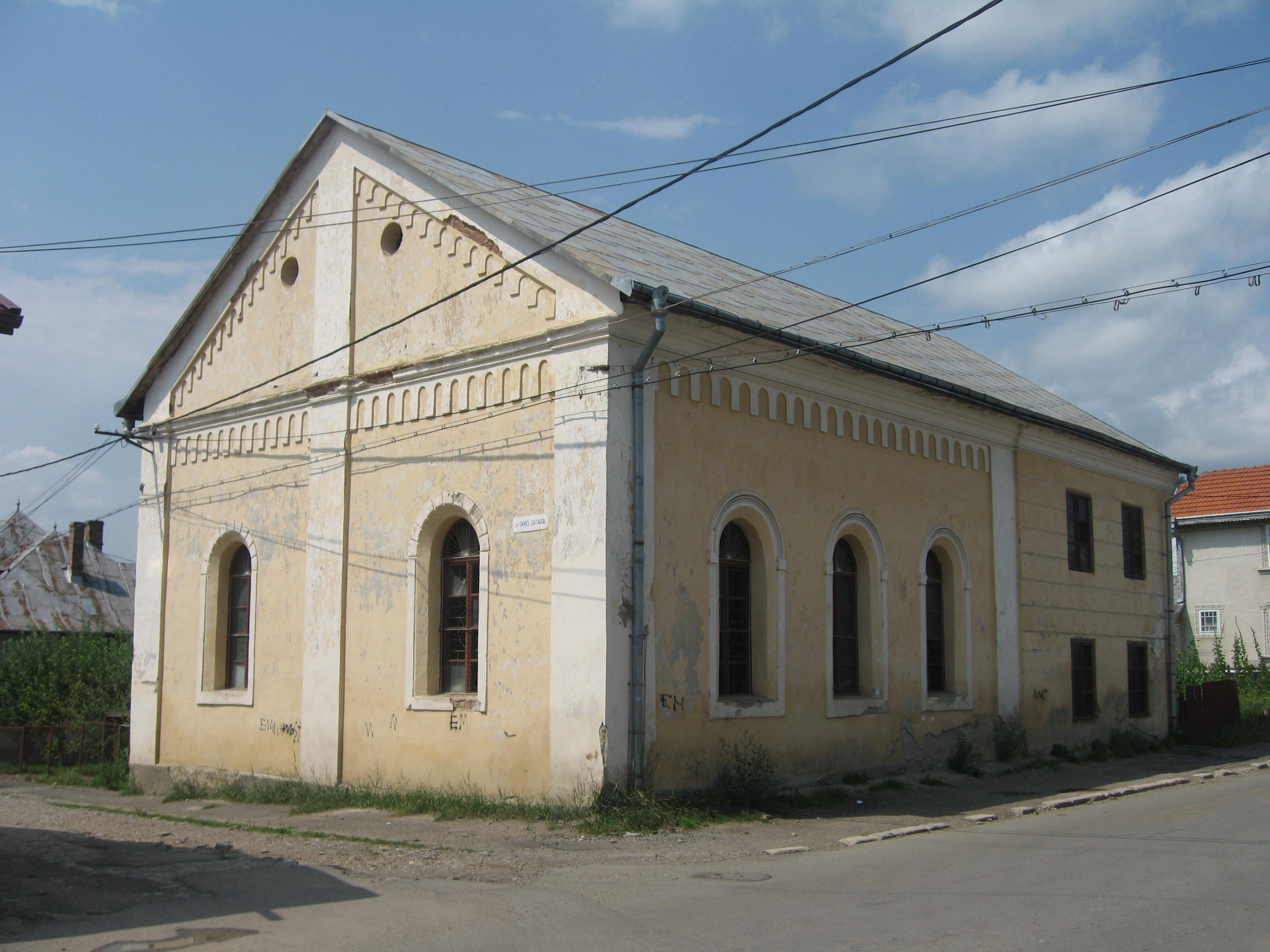
The Synagogue

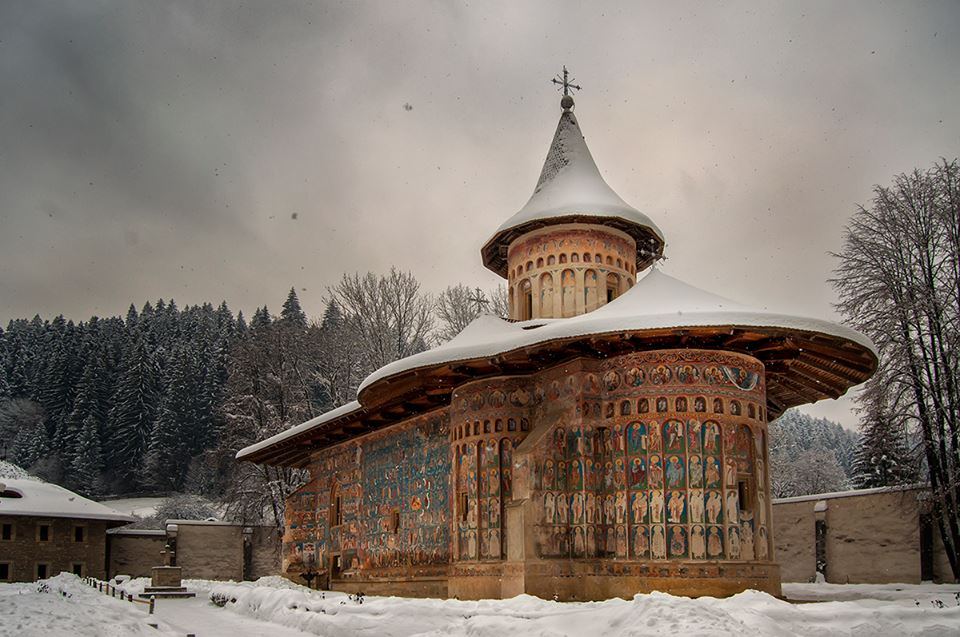
Voroneț Monastery
