= Valea Cerbului (Prahova) =

- Location within Romania

Location
- Country: Romania
- Counties: Prahova County

Physical characteristics
- Source: Bucegi Mountains
  - coordinates: 45°26′00″N 25°27′12″E
  - elevation: 2,352 m (7,717 ft)
- Mouth: Prahova
  - location: Bușteni
  - coordinates: 45°25′07″N 25°32′28″E
  - elevation: 584 m (1,916 ft)
- Length: 7 km (4.3 mi)
- Basin size: 26 km^{2} (10 sq mi)

Basin features
- Progression: Prahova→ Ialomița→ Danube→ Black Sea
- River code: XI.1.20.2

The Valea Cerbului is a right tributary of the river Prahova in Romania. It source is in the Bucegi Mountains. It flows into the Prahova in Bușteni. Its length is 7 km (4.3 mi) and its basin size is 26 km^{2} (10 sq mi).

== Tributaries ==
The following rivers are tributaries to the river Valea Cerbului (from source to mouth):

- Left: Pârâul Dracilor, Râpa Roșie, Fântânița, Valea Comorilor, Valea Morarului, Valea Seacă a Baiului, Pârâul Lung, Valea Baiului, Pârâul Scurt
- Right: Valea Căldărilor, Valea Priponului, Valea Caprelor, Valea Urzicii, Valea Țapului, Valea Seacă, Valea Scorușilor, Valea Coștilei, Valea Gâlmei
