= Polish Chileans =

Polish Chileans Polaco-Chileno
Total population
- 150.000

Regions with significant populations
- Santiago, Concepción, Valparaíso

Languages
- Chilean Spanish, Polish

Religion
- Roman Catholicism (ethnic Poles); Judaism (Polish Jews)

Related ethnic groups
- Poles, Polish Argentine, Polish Peruvians, Polish Bolivians, Polish Ecuadorians, Polish Paraguayans

Polish Chileans include immigrants to Chile from Poland and their descendants who recognize their Polish ancestry.

== Immigration ==
A small number of Poles came to Chile, with first of them coming during the Napoleonic Wars. In early 20th century, there were around 300 Poles in Chile. One of the most notable Polish Chileans, Ignacy Domeyko became chancellor of the University of Chile between 1867 and 1883. A remarkable architect, Luciano Kulczewski Garcia the grandson of the November 1831 Uprising, has been called the ¨national¨ architect of Chile for his unique and original buildings from the first part of the 20th century. After the World War II, 1947–1951, around 1,500 Poles, mostly former Zivilarbeiter (forced laborers in Nazi Germany), as well as former soldiers and inmates of Nazi concentration camps settled in Chile. In 1949 the Association of Poles in Chile was founded (reestablished formally as "Zjednoczenie Polskie w Chile im. Ignacego Domeyki" /Unión Polaca de Chile "Ignacio Domeyko" in 1992, president Andrzej Zabłocki). A significant majority of Polish Chileans live in Santiago.

In addition, during the Interbellum around 1000 Polish Jews immigrated to Chile, mostly for economic reasons.

Another Polonia organization in Chile is Koło im. Jana Pawła II ("Pope John Paul II Circle"), chairman Ewa Odachowska

Also, the Polish Catholic Mission (under Polish Episcopal Conference; pl:Polska Misja Katolicka) operates in Chile.

== Notable people ==
- Ignacy Domeyko
- Rodrigo Goldberg Mierzejewski, footballer
- Katty Kowaleczko, actress
- Luciano Kulczewski, architect
- Cecilia Domeyko, journalist/filmmaker/author (and great-granddaughter of Ignacy Domeyko)
- Karen Poniachik, journalist/politician
- Sonia Tschorne, architect/politician
- David Rosenmann-Taub, musician/poet
- Paz Domeyko, author/biographer
- Eyal Meyer, actor and Kalaripayattu instructor of Polish descent

== See also ==
- Chile–Poland relations
- Immigration to Chile
- Polish diaspora
