= Chile–Poland relations =

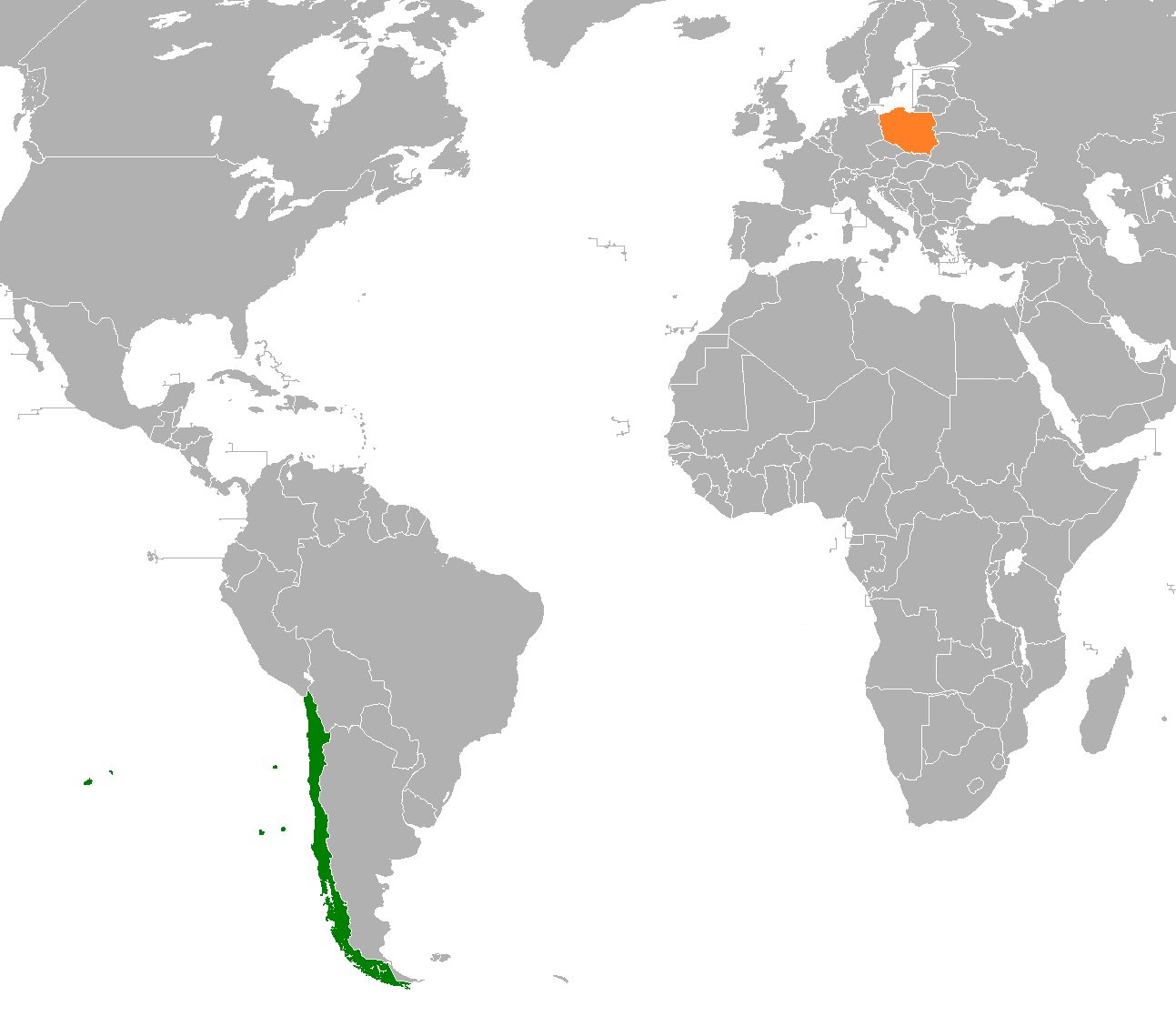
- Chile: Poland

Chile and Poland maintain diplomatic relations. Both nations are members of the OECD.

== History ==
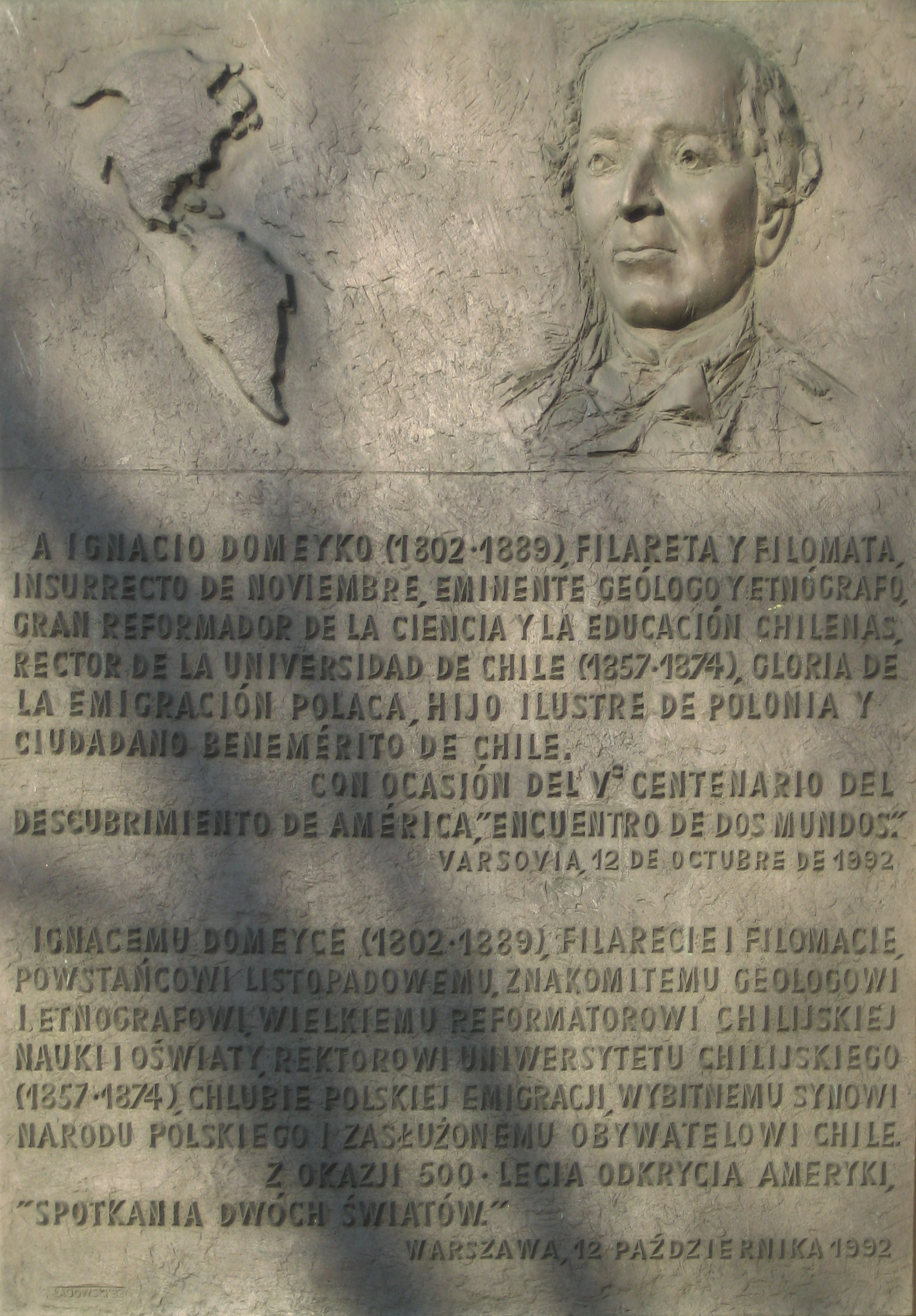
Plaque in Warsaw honoring Ignacy Domeyko, Polish-Chilean geologist, mineralogist and educator.

In the late 1700s, a small number of Polish migrants settled in Chile, several of them having served in the Napoleonic Wars. In 1916, Chile founded a Pro Polonia foundation. In August 1919, Chile recognized a newly independent Poland after the nation regained its independence after World War I. In 1920, both nations established diplomatic relations. In 1921, Poland opened an honorary consulate in Santiago and accredited relations from its embassy in Buenos Aires, Argentina. In 1926, Chile opened a consulate in Gdańsk. During this time period, approximately 1,200 Polish Jews immigrated to Chile.

During World War II, diplomatic relations between both nations were non-existent. During the war, Chile founded a "Foundation for the Assistance of Victims of War" whose mission was to assist Polish people under Nazi German occupation. Soon after the war, Chile recognized the Polish Provisional Government of National Unity on 18 February 1946. During this time, Chile received approximately 1,500 Polish refugees, ex-prisoners from forced labor and concentration camps and former soldiers of the Polish army. In 1949, the "Union of Polish People in Chile" was founded and they had their own magazine called Polak w Chile (Polish People in Chile).

On 25 May 1962, Poland opened a commercial office in Santiago and on 7 January 1965, both nations elevated their diplomatic relations to an embassy. On 10 October 1973, soon after the Chilean coup d'état, diplomatic relations between Chile and Poland were severed by Chilean General Augusto Pinochet who was a staunch anti-communist. After democracy was restored to Chile in 1989, both nations re-established diplomatic relations on 11 March 1990. In 1995, former Polish President Lech Wałęsa paid a visit to Chile to partake on a conference titled Solidarity and Peace in the New Millennium.

In March 2000, Prime Minister Jerzy Buzek paid an official visit to Chile becoming the first Polish head of government to visit the country. In 1999, President Eduardo Frei Ruiz-Tagle became the first Chilean head of state to visit Poland.

== High-level visits ==
Presidential visits from Chile to Poland

- President Eduardo Frei Ruiz-Tagle (1999)
- President Ricardo Lagos (2002)

Presidential and Prime Ministerial visits from Poland to Chile

- Prime Minister Jerzy Buzek (2000)
- President Aleksander Kwasniewski (2002)
- Prime Minister Donald Tusk (2007)

== Bilateral relations ==
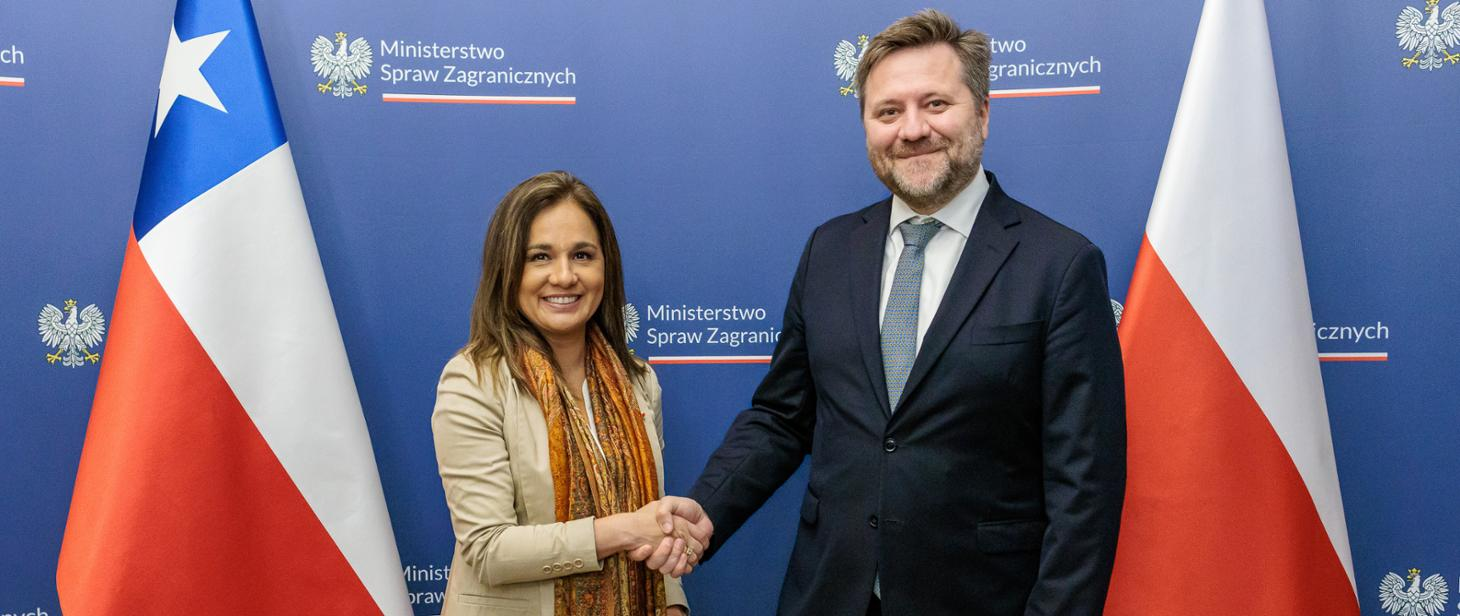
Undersecretary of State of the Ministry of Foreign Affairs of Poland Wojciech Gerwel and Deputy Minister of Foreign Affairs of Chile Gloria de la Fuente in 2023

Both nations have signed several bilateral agreements such as a Treaty of Conciliation between Poland and Chile (1931); Agreement on the Suspension of Visa Requirements for Touristic Purposes (1995); Agreement on the Protection of Investments (1995); Agreement on Cultural and Scientific Cooperation (1995); Agreement on Political Consultations (1999); Agreement on the avoidance of Double-Taxation (2000), Agreement on Cooperation in the fight against Narcotrafficking and International Criminal Organizations (2006) and an Agreement on Employment of Dependants of Staff of Diplomatic and Consular Missions in both nations (2008).

== Trade ==
In 2002, Chile signed a free trade agreement with the European Union (which includes Poland since joining the EU in 2004). In 2018, trade between Chile and Poland totaled US$393 million. Chile's main exports to Poland include: copper, frozen fish, wine, grapes and salmon. Poland's main export to Chile include: gas turbines, frozen meat, medicine, transport vehicles and cranes. Polish multinational mining company KGHM Polska Miedź operates in Chile.

== Resident diplomatic missions ==
- Chile has an embassy in Warsaw.
- Poland has an embassy in Santiago.
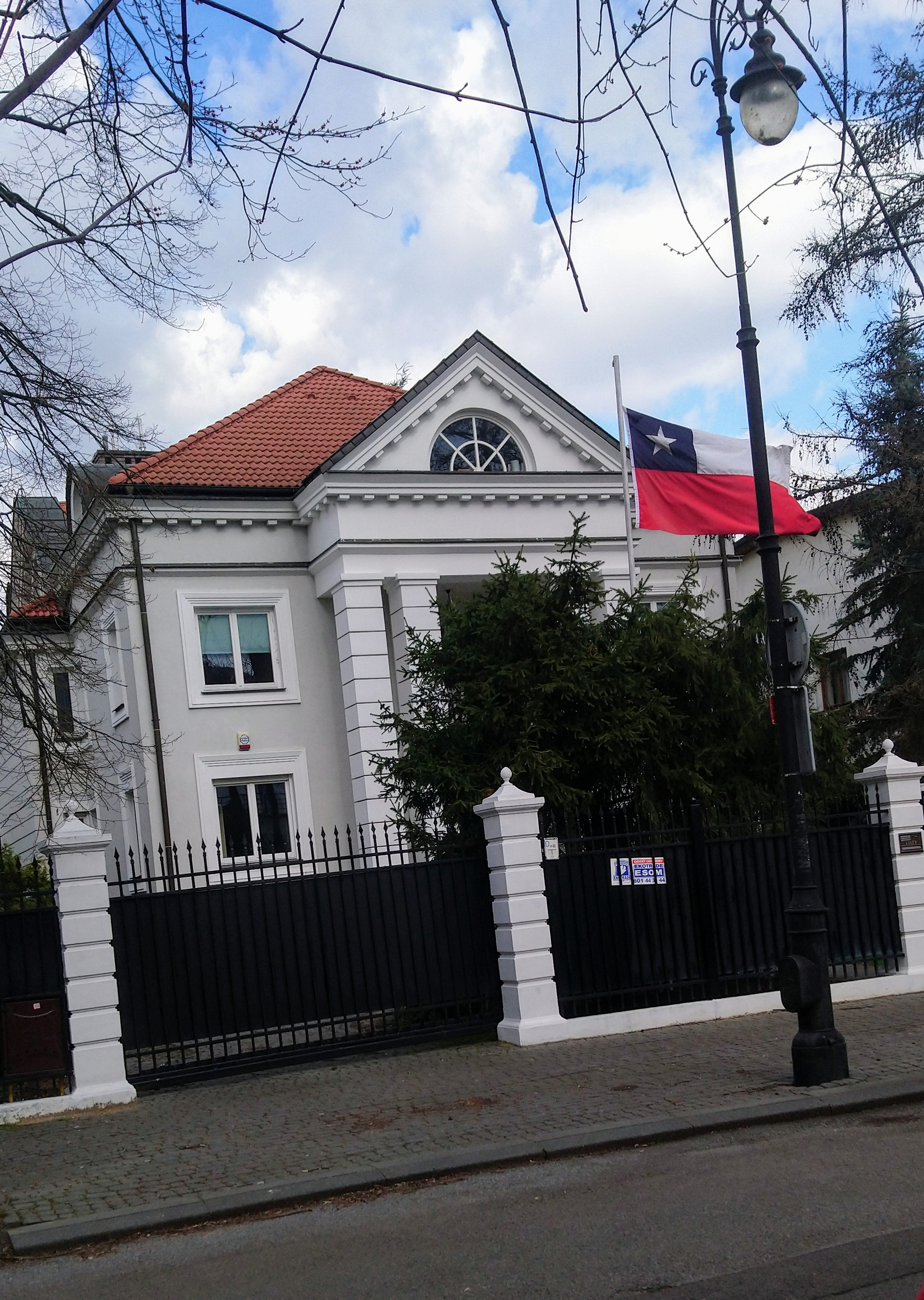
Embassy of Chile in Warsaw

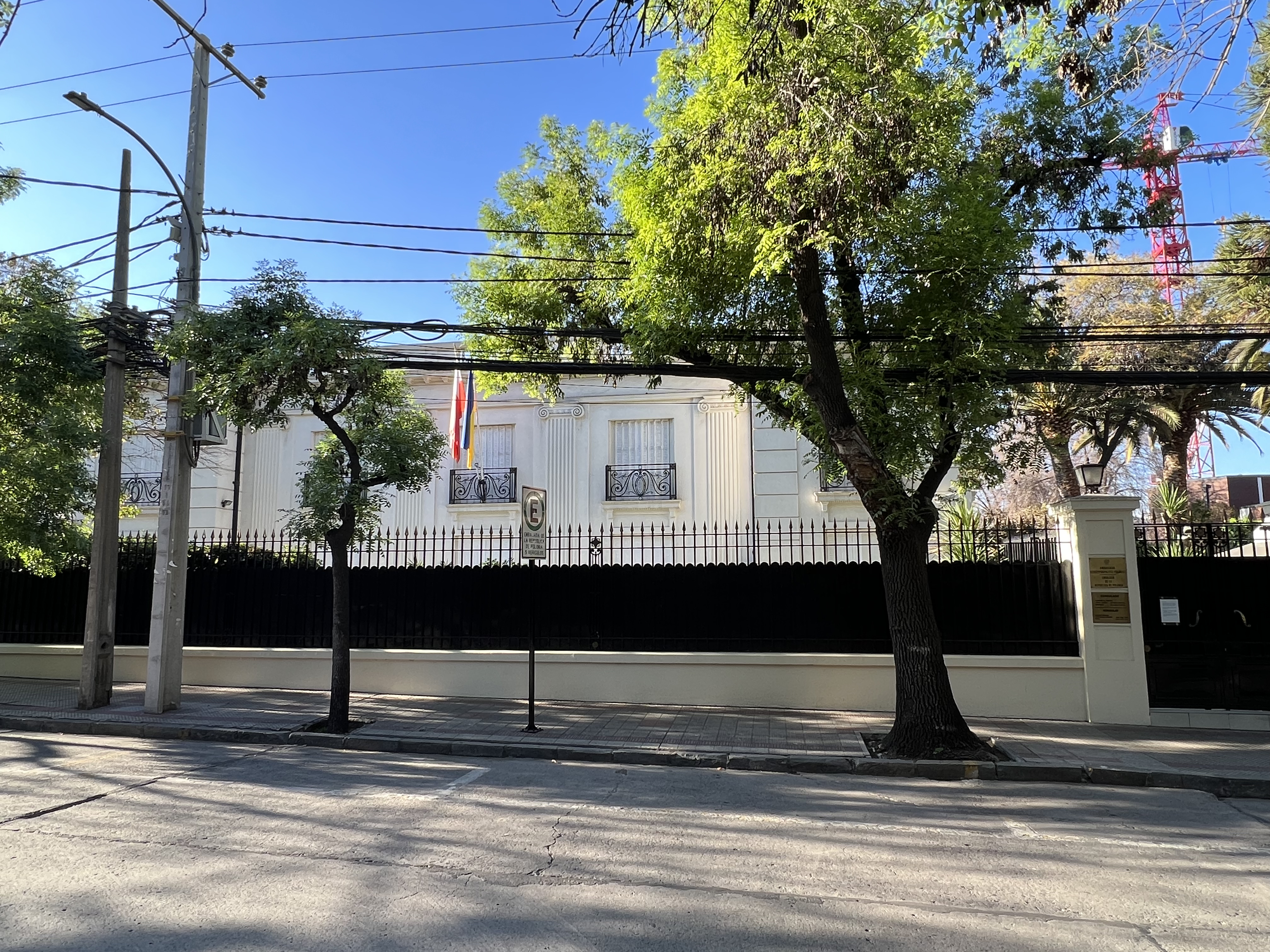
Embassy of Poland in Santiago

== See also ==
- Foreign relations of Chile
- Foreign relations of Poland
- Polish Chileans
