= Polish diaspora =

People of Polish heritage who live outside Poland

World map of Polish diaspora. Poland + 10,000,000 + 1,000,000 + 100,000 + 10,000

The Polish diaspora comprises Poles and people of Polish heritage or origin who live outside Poland. The Polish diaspora is also known in modern Polish as Polonia, the name for Poland in Latin and many Romance languages.

There are roughly 85,500,000 people of Polish ancestry living outside Poland, making the Polish diaspora one of the largest in the world and one of the most widely dispersed. Reasons for displacement include border shifts, forced expulsions, resettlement by voluntary and forced exile, and political or economic emigration.

Substantial populations of Polish ancestry can be found in their native region of Central and Eastern Europe and many other European countries as well as in the Americas and Australia.

The Polonia in English-speaking countries often uses a dialect of Polish called Ponglish. It is made up of a Polish core with many English words inside it.

There are also smaller Polish communities in Asia and Africa, most notably Kazakhstan and South Africa.

== History ==
Poles participated in the creation of the first European settlements in the Americas. In the 17th century, Polish missionaries arrived for the first time in Japan. Vast numbers of Poles left the country during the Partitions of Poland for economic and political reasons as well as the ethnic persecution practised by Russia, Prussia and Austria.

Many of the Poles who emigrated were Jews, who make up part of the Jewish diaspora. The Second Polish Republic was home to the world's largest Jewish population. It was followed by invasions of Poland by Germany and the Soviet Union. Around 6 million Polish citizens perished during World War II: about one fifth of the pre-war population. Around 3 million of which were Polish Jews murdered in the Holocaust by Nazi Germany during World War II. Most survivors subsequently migrated to Mandate Palestine since Poland was the only Eastern Bloc country to allow free Jewish aliyah without visas or exit permits at the end of the war. Many remaining Jews, including Stalinist hardliners and members of security apparatus, left Poland during the 1968 Polish political crisis, when the Polish United Workers' Party, pressured by Leonid Brezhnev, joined the Soviet "anti-Zionist" campaign that was triggered by the Six-Day War. In 1998, Poland's Jewish population was estimated at 10,000 to 30,000.

A recent, large emigration of Poles took place after Poland acceded to the European Union and opening of the EU's labour market. About 2 million primarily young Poles took up jobs abroad. Most Poles live in Europe, the Americas, and Australia, but a few Poles have settled in smaller numbers in Asia, Africa, and Oceania, as economic migrants or as part of Catholic missions.

== Europe ==
All countries and areas of residence thereafter are listed in alphabetical order.

=== Belarus ===
Poles by district in Belarus in 1960: Over 50% Polish 40-50% 30-40% 10-30% Up to 10% Polish Border of Poland in 1939

According to the census, there are 598,850 Poles living in Belarus (official 1999 census; the estimates are higher according to various NGOs). They form the second-largest ethnic minority in the country, after Russians. Most Poles live in western Belarus (including 294,000 in the Grodno Region, Polish: Grodzieńszczyzna).

During the Second World War, the Soviet Union forcibly resettled large numbers of Belarusian Poles to Russia, Kazakhstan, and Uzbekistan. Few Belarusian Poles now live in Siberia and the Russian Far East, and some of those who managed to survive resettlement returned to Poland after 1956.

The census of 1959 had 538,881 ethnic Poles in Belarus (332,300 in Grodno Region, 83,800 in Vitebsk Region, 70,000 in Minsk Region including Minsk, 42,100 in Brest Region, 7,200 in Gomel Region and 3,500 in Mogilev Region).

=== Benelux ===
There were some migrations from Poland to the Netherlands in the early modern period, with notable emigrants including painters Krzysztof Lubieniecki and Teodor Lubieniecki, and Admiral Krzysztof Arciszewski who served in the Dutch West India Company.

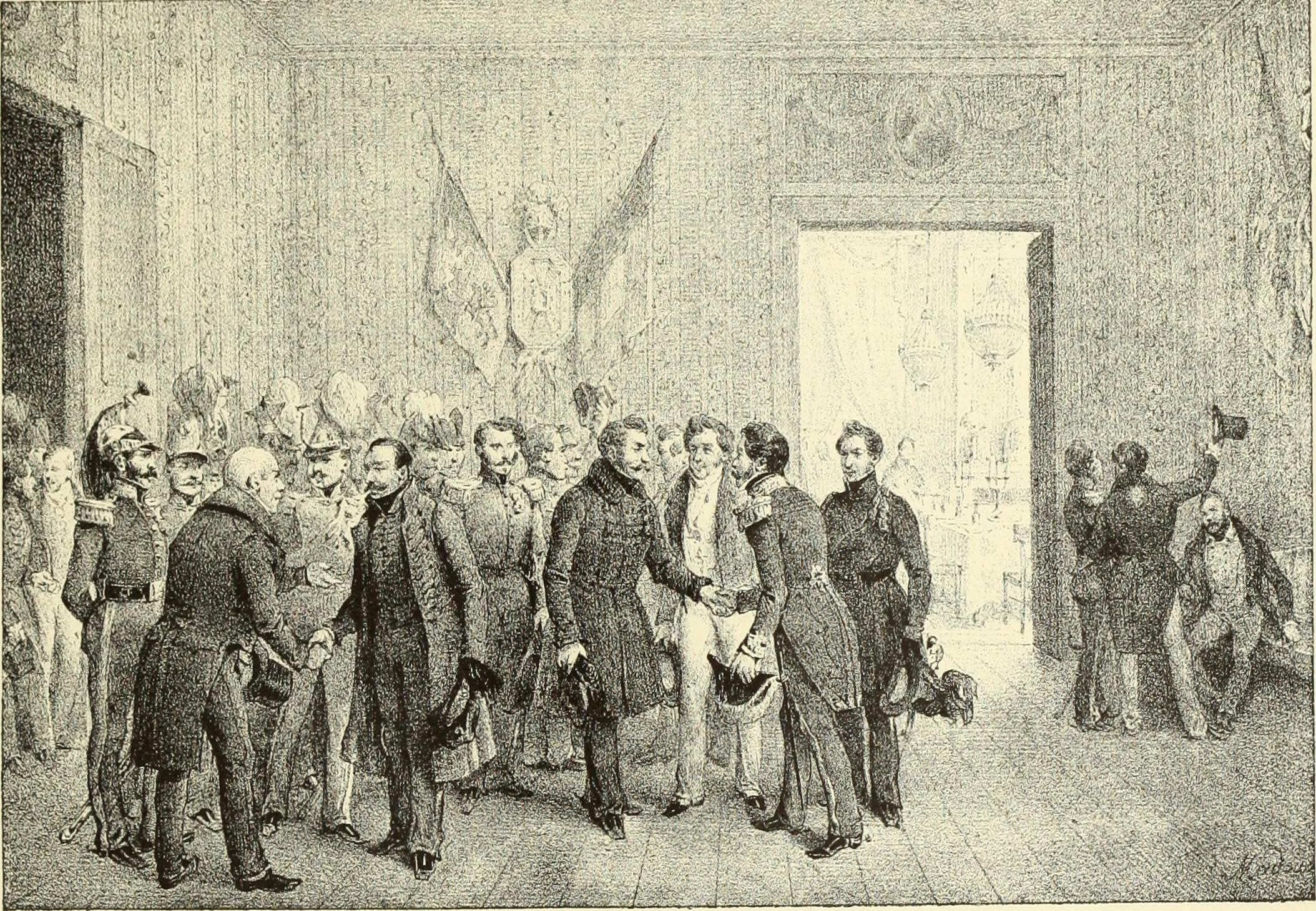
Polish refugees received in Brussels after the November Uprising

Some 200 Poles, mostly intelligentsia and military officers, fled to Belgium after the unsuccessful Polish November Uprising in the 1830s, with some 60 officers employed the Belgian army, including Polish General Jan Zygmunt Skrzynecki, who was in charge of organizing the newly formed Belgian army, and others serving as instructors. The Great Emigration marked the first notable wave of Polish migration to Belgium. Some 200 Poles fled to Belgium, mostly to Brussels, Ghent and Liège, after the fall of the Polish January Uprising.

Polish immigration to the Netherlands has steadily increased since Poland joined the EU, and now 173,231 Polish people live in the country (2021, first generation. Most of them are guest workers from the European Union contract labour program, as more Poles obtain light industrial jobs. The number of Polish nationals could double in the next decade, depending on economic conditions in Poland. Most Poles in the Netherlands are in The Hague (30,000), but Polish émigrés have been long settled in Amsterdam and industrial towns or cities like Utrecht and Groningen. Polish immigrants arrived to find employment in the country in the 19th and 20th centuries. Some 3,200 Poles lived in the Netherlands in the 1920s.

Belgium has 70,000 Poles, but the number of Belgians of Polish descent could be as high as 200,000). Present Queen of the Belgians, Mathilde, is daughter to a Pole, Countess Anna Maria d'Udekem d'Acoz, née Komorowska.

Luxembourg has 4,844 (as of 2020).

=== Bulgaria ===
According to 2023 estimates of the Polish Embassy in Sofia, some 5,500 Poles and people of Polish descent live in Bulgaria. Polish presence in Bulgaria dates back to the 19th century, with Poles contributing to the development of the country, after it regained independence.

=== Czech Republic ===
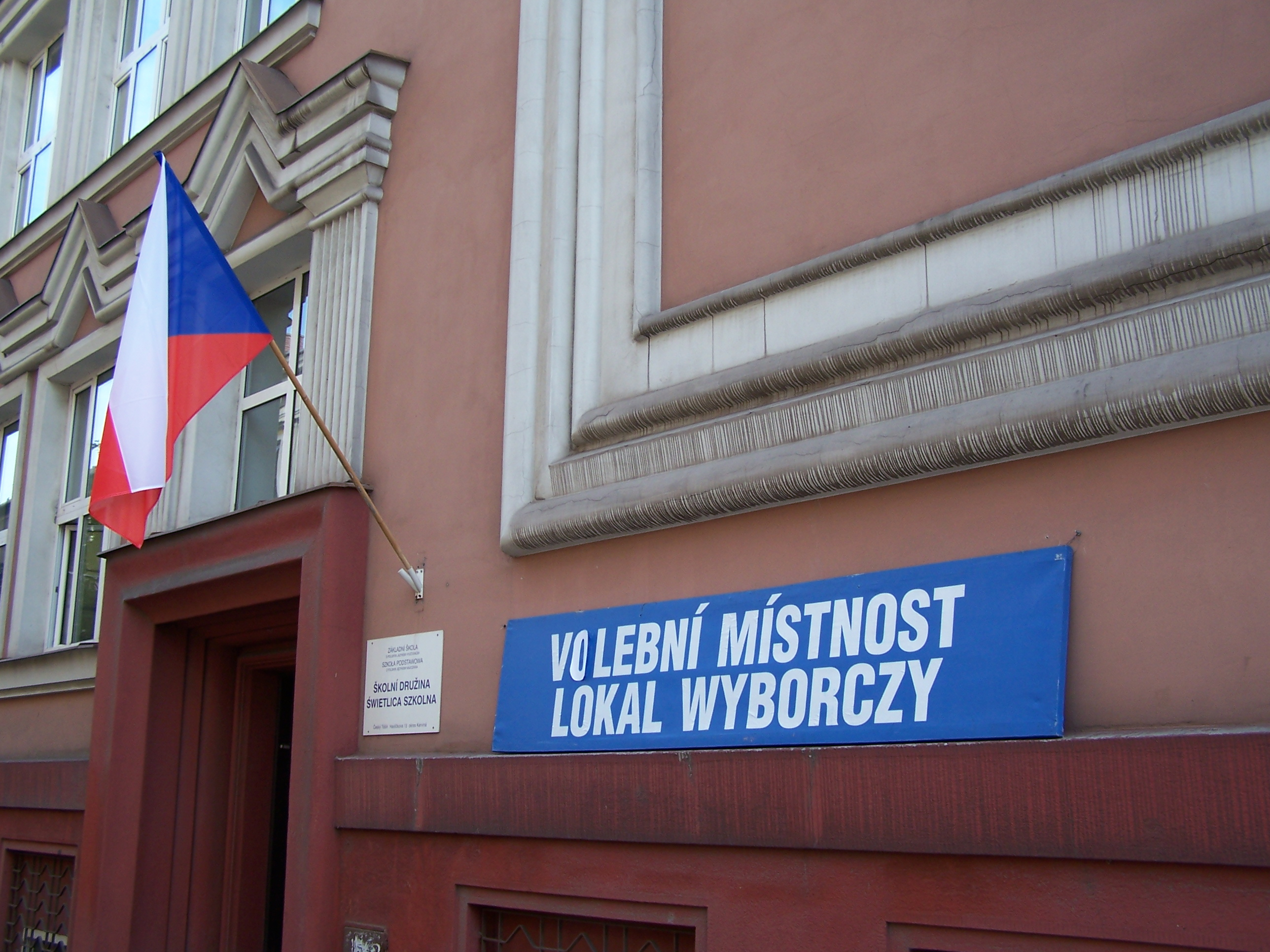
Czech-Polish bilingual signs during the municipal elections in Český Těšín, Czech Republic

The Polish community in the Czech Republic is concentrated in Cieszyn Silesia (or Trans-Olza), in the northeast of the country. It traces its origins to border changes after the First World War that partitioned the area between Poland and what was then Czechoslovakia, leaving many Poles on what is now the Czech side of the border. The Polish population was 38,218 at the 2021 census.

=== Denmark ===
By 1904, there was a Polish community consisting of several thousand workers scattered throughout Denmark. Polak w Danii ("Pole in Denmark"), the oldest Polish newspaper in Denmark, was first published in July 1918, several months before Poland regained independence.

According to the Danish government's statistics, almost 51,000 Polish citizen live in Denmark. Up to 70,000 might have Polish ancestry. Most live in the capital, Copenhagen.

=== Finland ===
The history of the Polish community in Finland dates from the early 19th century when many Poles from the Russian-controlled part of the country settled there. In 1917, there were around 4,000 Poles in Finland, mostly soldiers of the Russian Imperial Army. In 1917, the Polish Legion in Finland was formed to fight for Finnish independence and then stationed in Viipuri, and after the Finnish victory some 2,500 Polish soldiers were evacuated to Poland. Some 200 Poles lived in Finland in the 1920s.

Finland has never been a major destination for Polish immigrants, and only around 5,400 Poles live there. Most are well-educated: musicians, medical doctors, engineers and architects with families. Around half lives in Helsinki, and the biggest Polish organization there is the Polish Association, founded on April 3, 1917.

=== France ===
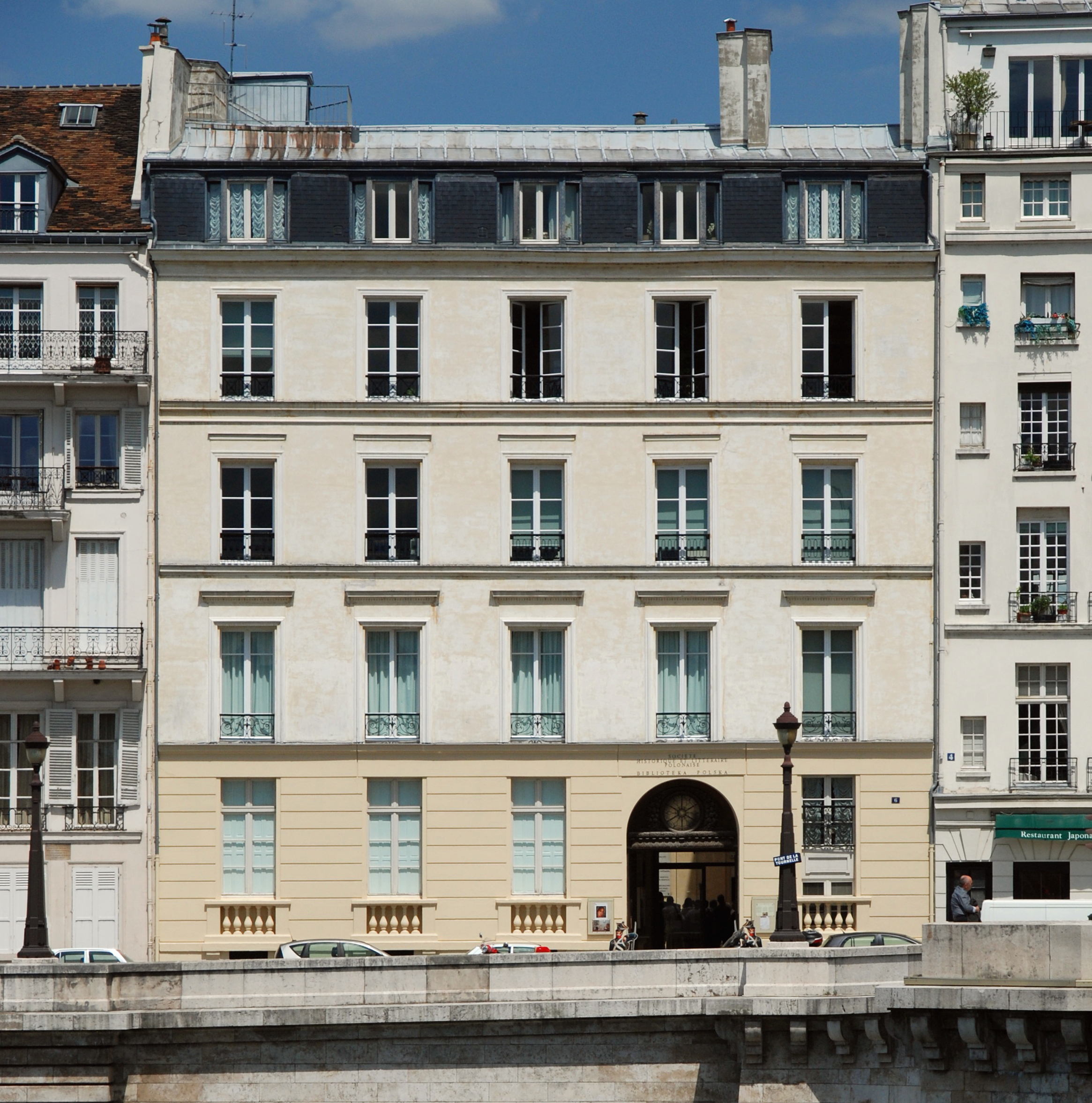
Polish Library in Paris

Between one million and three people of Polish descent live in France. They are concentrated in the Nord-Pas de Calais region, the metropolitan areas of Lille and Paris and the coal-mining basin (Bassin Minier) around Lens and Valenciennes. Prominent members have included Frédéric Chopin, Adam Mickiewicz, René Goscinny, Marie Curie, Michel Poniatowski, Raymond Kopa, Ludovic Obraniak and Edward Gierek. For centuries, there was an alliance between the France and the Polish–Lithuanian Commonwealth: the longest-reigning queen consort of France has been a Pole, Marie Leszczyńska. Many Poles settled in France after the rule of Napoleon and the collapse of the Duchy of Warsaw, when 100,000 Poles, largely political refugees, fled the Russians and Prussians, who took over Poland. The Great Emigration, from the first half of the 19th century onwards, caused many Poles to be enlisted to fight in the French army. Another wave of Polish migration took place between the two World Wars when many were hired as contract workers to work temporarily in France. Polish refugees also fled the Nazi and Soviet occupations in the 1940s. From 150,000 to 250,000 Poles have been estimated to live in Paris. Many EU immigrants are in southern France, including the cities of Arles, Marseille and Perpignan.

=== Germany ===
The second-largest Polonia in the world and the largest in Europe is the Polish minority in Germany. Estimates of the number of Poles living in Germany vary from 4 million to about 5 million. The main Polonia organization is Kongres Polonii Niemieckiej / Polnischer Kongress in Deutschland.

=== Greece ===
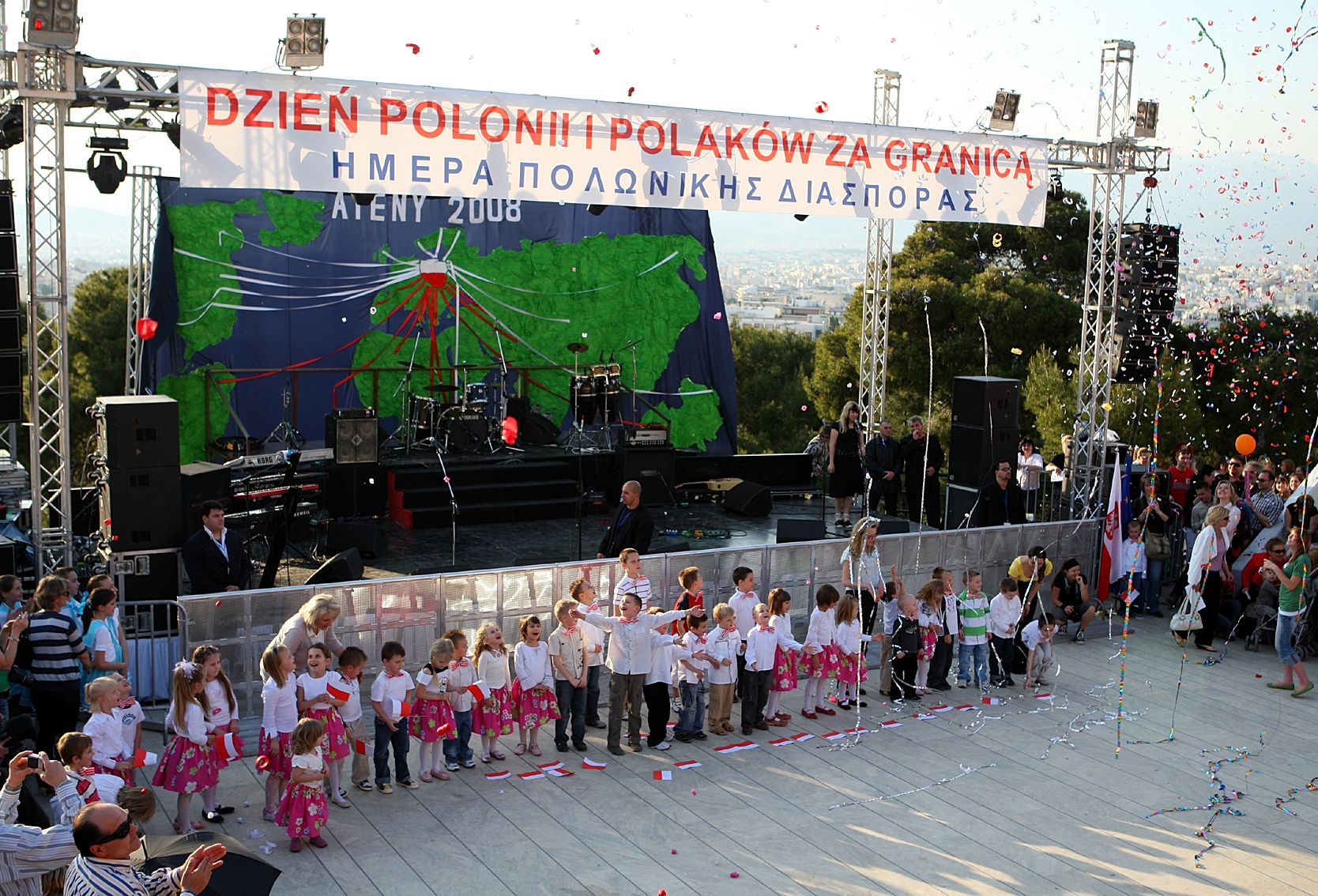
Polonia Days in Athens (2008)

The Polish minority in Greece numbers more than 50,000, most of whom are first-generation immigrants. There might be many more since the Greek Orthodox Church administers Greek names for marriage and christening. Statistics show that over 300,000 Poles visit Greece each year for tourism, especially during the summer months. Famous people with mixed Polish and Greek ethnicity include Polish singer Eleni Tzoka.

=== Hungary ===
The Polish minority in Hungary is 7,001, according to the 2011 census, and has a long history of over 1000 years. The Kingdom of Poland and Polish–Lithuanian Commonwealth contained five exclaves in Spisz surrounded by territory of the Kingdom of Hungary, and following the Partitions of Poland, the Hungarian part of the Austro-Hungarian Empire (1867–1918), contained Spisz and Orava with sizeable indigenous Polish populations. Hungary–Poland relations are strong and positive and best described in a poem, "Pole, Hungarian, two good friends," about the fraternal sense of commonality in both Polish and Hungarian cultures. Budapest is home to a large Polish community, and there are also ethnic Poles in the northern part of the country, bordering Slovakia and Ukraine. Most Polish-Hungarians are practising Roman Catholics, but many are members of the Eastern (Polish-Carpathian or Carpato-Ukrainian) and Greek Catholic Churches.

=== Iceland ===
In 2021, Statistics Iceland recorded 18,508 Polish-born people living in Iceland, with Poles constituting roughly 5% of the total population. Poles are, by far, the largest ethnic minority in the country.

=== Ireland ===
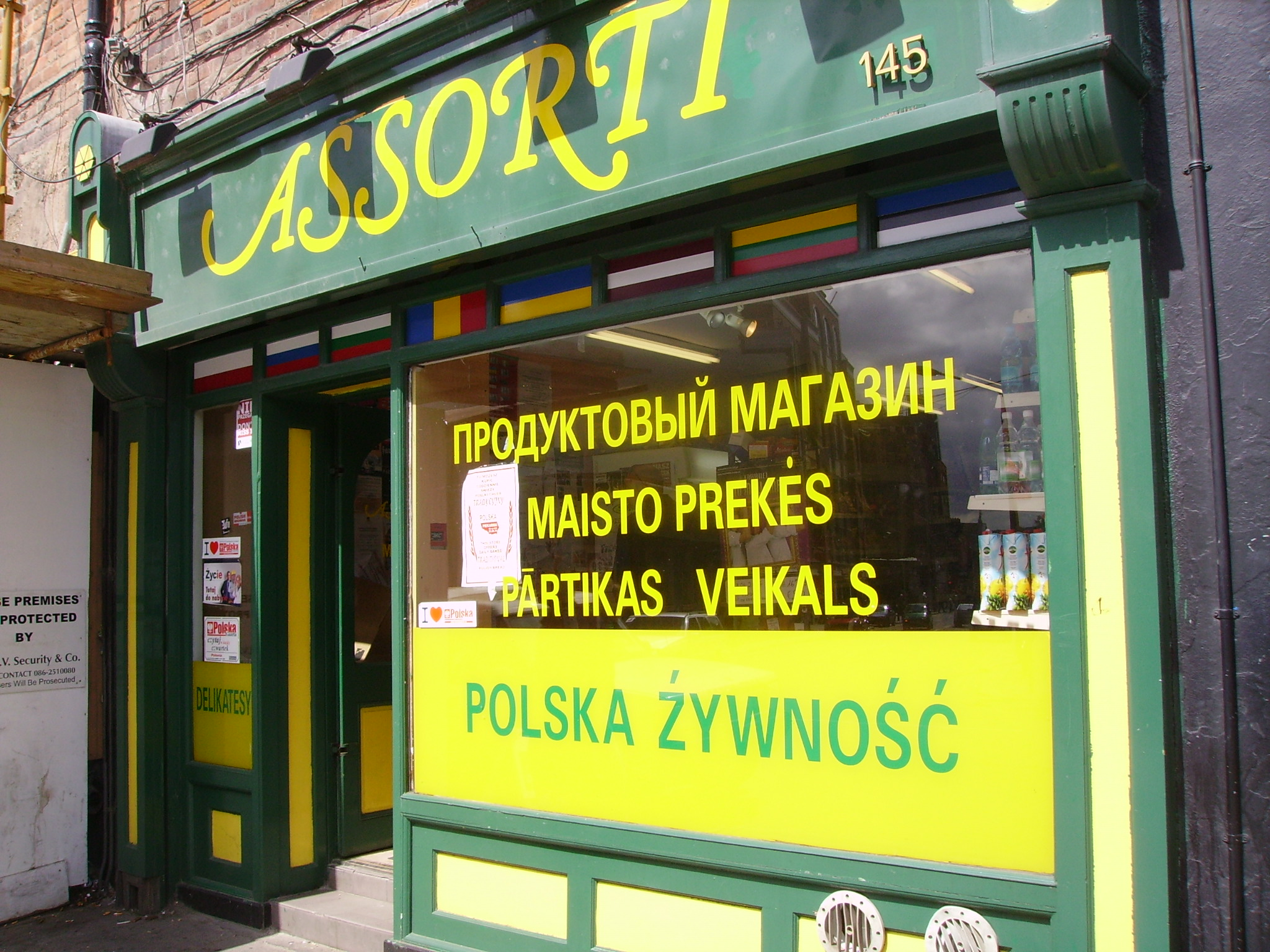
A Polish shop in Dublin, Ireland

After Poland joined the European Union in 2004, Ireland immediately opened its borders and welcomed Polish workers as relatively cheap qualified labour (only the United Kingdom and Sweden did the same). Ireland quickly became a key destination for young Poles seeking work outside the country. According to the 2011 census, there are 122,585 Poles living in Ireland, the largest ethnic minority in the country.

=== Italy ===
The Polish minority of confirmed status in Italy is 130,982 ,whereas the estimated total is 100,000, as of 2023. Most Poles are late-20th-century immigrants drawn by the Italian economy's desire for imported labour. Large Polish immigrant communities are found in Rome, Milan and Venice. Polish immigration to Italy might continue while the EU contract labour program between the two countries remains in place.

History of Polish migration to Italy dates back over 500 years. In the 1920s, some 1,000 Poles lived in Italy, mostly clergy, artists, scholars and students, with Polish associations active in Rome and Trieste.

=== Latvia ===
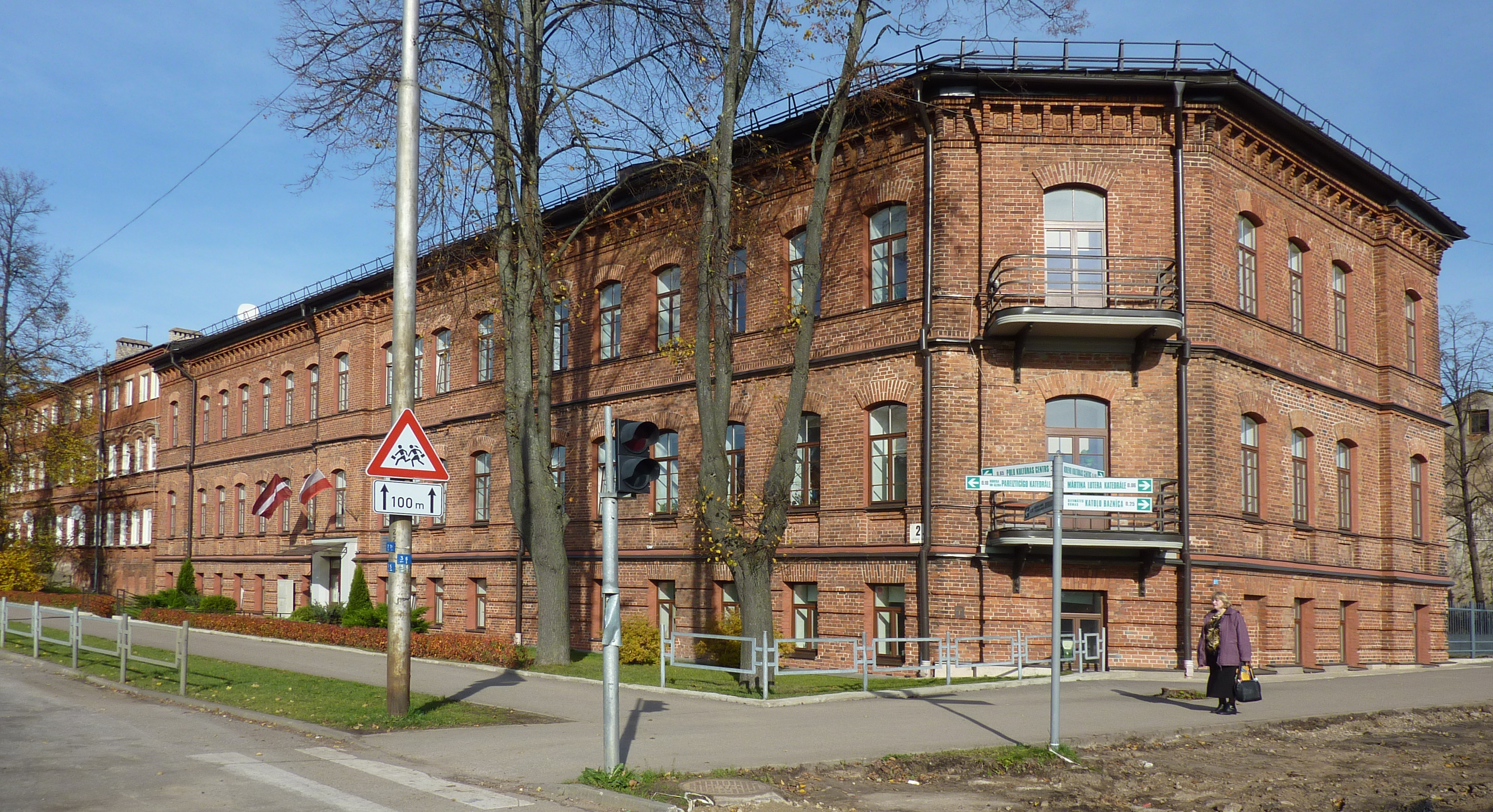
J. Piłsudski Daugavpils State Polish Gymnasium

Poles form about 2.3% of Latvia's total population and number 51,548 people. They are mainly concentrated in Latvia's largest cities: Riga and Daugavpils. Since most of them don't use Latvian as their primary language their citizenship status can vary.

=== Lithuania ===
According to 2021 census, Poles are 6.52% of Lithuania's population, totaling 288,429 people and over 16% of Vilnius population.

=== Moldova ===
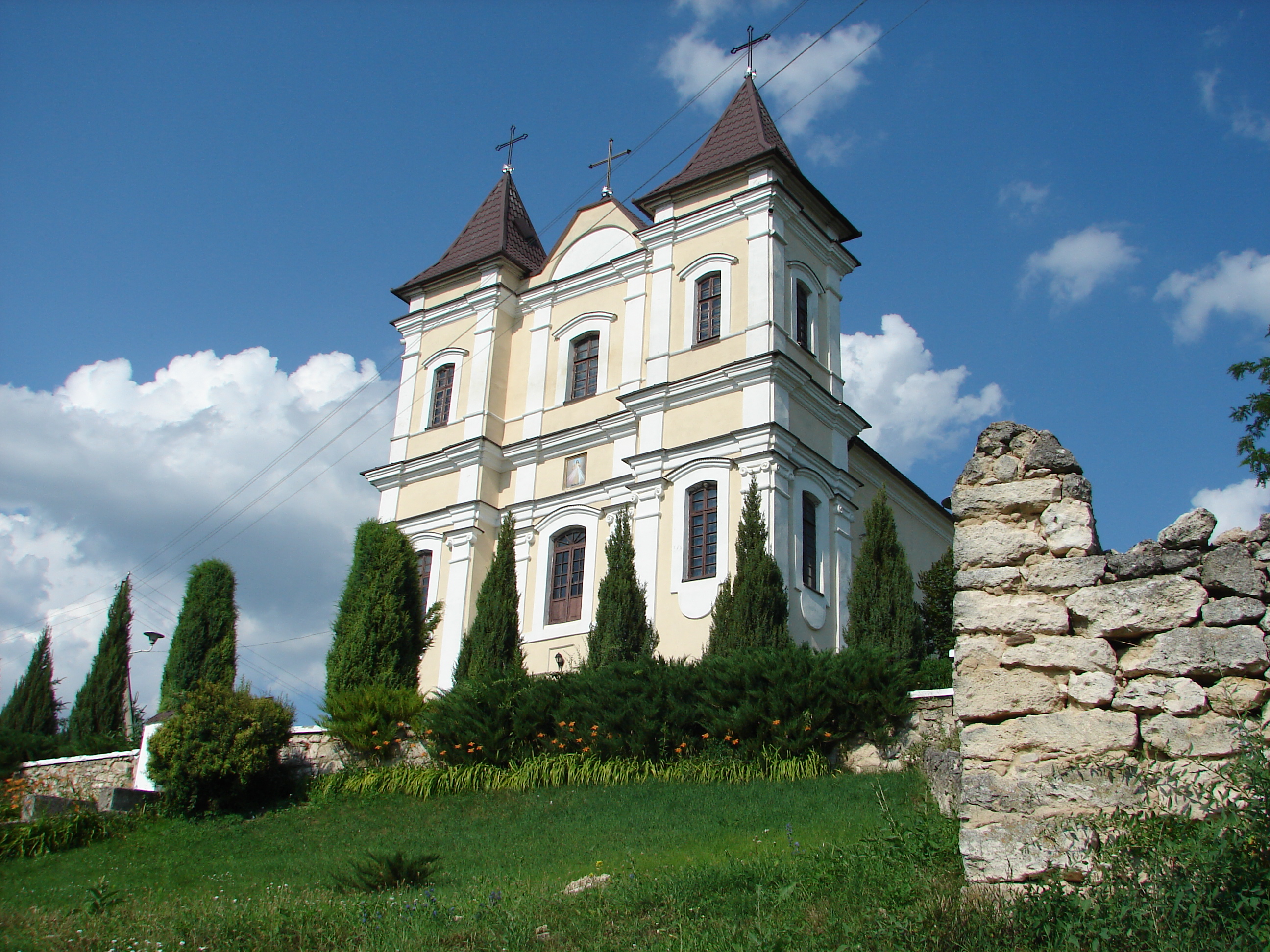
Polish Saint Cajetan Church, Rașcov, Moldova

Polish presence in the territories of present-day Moldova dates back several centuries, as the northern part of modern Transnistria formed part of the Kingdom of Poland before the Partitions of Poland, and the Principality of Moldavia was a vassal state of the Kingdom of Poland and the Polish–Lithuanian Commonwealth at various times. The most numerous Polish communities in Moldova live in the cities of Bălți, Chișinău, Rîbnița (former Polish: Rybnica) and Tiraspol. According to the 2004 census, comprising both Moldova and Transnistria, there were 8,896 Poles in the country.

=== Norway ===
According to the Norwegian Statistics Bureau (Statistisk sentralbyrå), there are 137,425 Poles in Norway (2024 Official Norway estimate) and makeup 2.48% of the Norwegian population. It is the largest ethnic minority in the country. Norway has recently experienced an influx of Polish migrant workers. This is because Norway is a member of the European Economic Area, providing the same free movement of labour as between members of the European Union.

=== Portugal ===
There are, as of December 2022, approximately 4,326 Poles in Portugal, mainly recent immigrants. In addition, around 300 Poles have acquired Portuguese citizenship since 2008 thus making the number of Poles in the country stand at around 4,650 people. Amongst the most notable Luso-Poles there are José de Chelmicki, general of the Portuguese army, revolutionary João Guilherme Ratcliff, architect Étienne de Gröer, writer Esther Mucznik, intellectual Mário Dorminsky, historian Samuel Schwartz and footballer Tomás Podstawski.

=== Romania ===
According to the 2021 census, 2,137 Poles live in Romania, mainly in the villages of the Suceava County (Polish: Suczawa). There are even three exclusively Polish villages: Nowy Sołoniec (Soloneţu Nou), Plesza (Pleşa), and Pojana Mikuli (Poiana Micului). Poles in Romania form an officially recognised national minority and have one seat in the Chamber of Deputies (currently held by Ghervazen Longher) and access to Polish elementary schools and cultural centres (known as "Polish Houses").

=== Russia ===
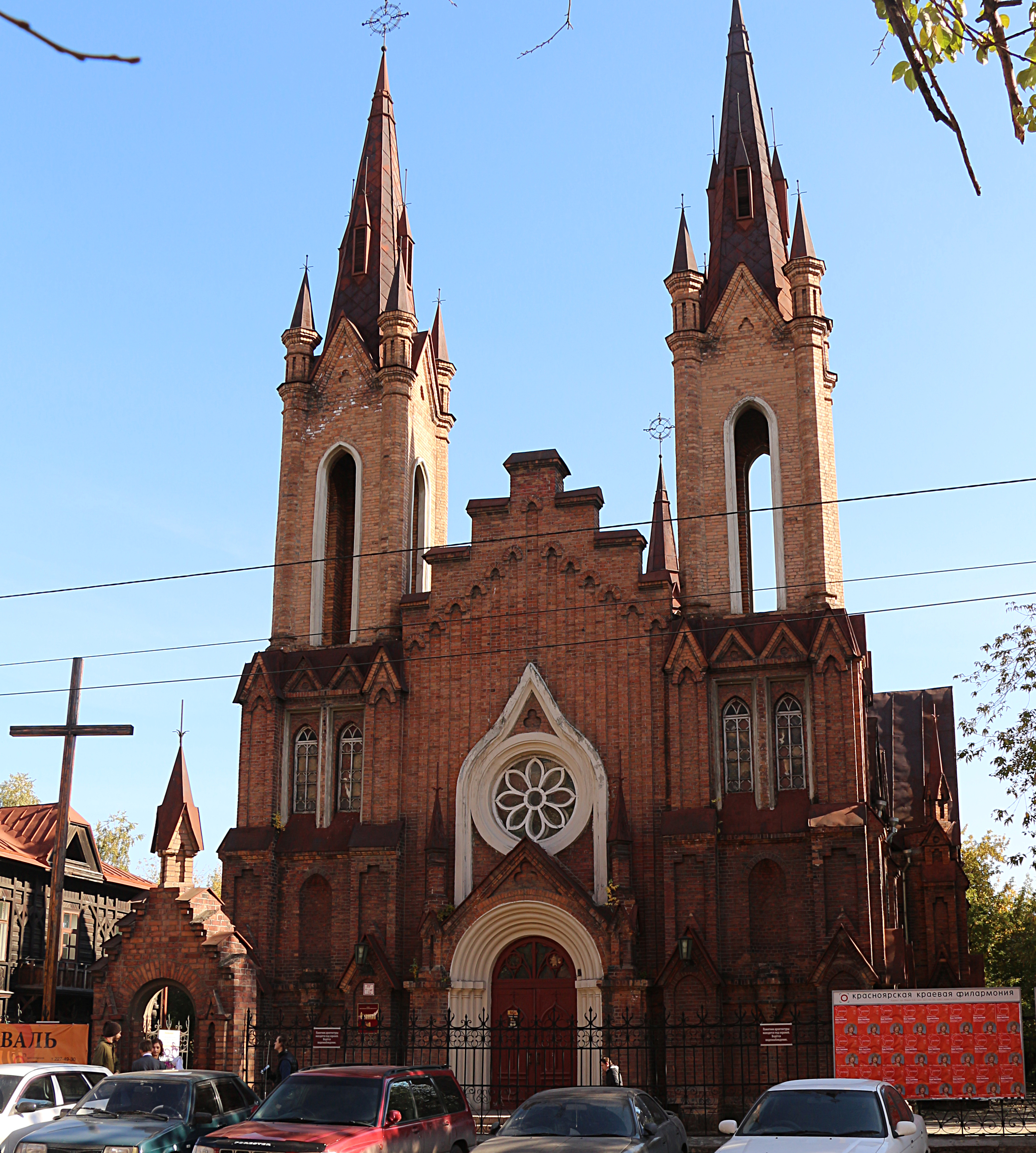
Catholic Cathedral of the Transfiguration in Krasnoyarsk, Siberia, built by Polish-Russian architect Vladimir Sokolowski

Following the Partitions of Poland, Russia annexed the largest portion of the Polish–Lithuanian Commonwealth, and afterwards many Poles were either deported eastwards as political prisoners or were conscripted to the Russian Army, and some migrated voluntarily.

During the Second World War, the Soviet Union annexed large parts of Poland's former eastern territories of Kresy. Many Poles were expelled, but a significant number remained in what is now Belarus, Ukraine, and Lithuania. The Soviet authorities also forcibly resettled large numbers of Poles to Russia, Kazakhstan, and Uzbekistan. In Russia there are about 91,500 Poles. See Polish minority in Russia for details.

=== Serbia ===
There is a small community of descendants of Silesian miners in Ostojićevo. In the 2012 census, 9,741 declared themselves as Poles.

=== Slovakia ===
According to the 2011 Slovak census results, there are 3,084 (0.1%) Poles living in Slovakia. Compared to the Hungarian census of 1910, there has been a significant decrease, as then there were 10,569 Polish-language speakers in the territory of present Slovakia.

=== Spain ===
The Polish minority in Spain numbers between 45,000 and 60,000. The Polish population is mainly guest workers who took advantage of Spain's economic boom during the 1990s. Madrid, Barcelona, Seville, San Sebastian and Valencia have significant Polish populations. The Polish minority in Spain is relatively young, 74% are between 20 and 49 years old.

=== Sweden ===
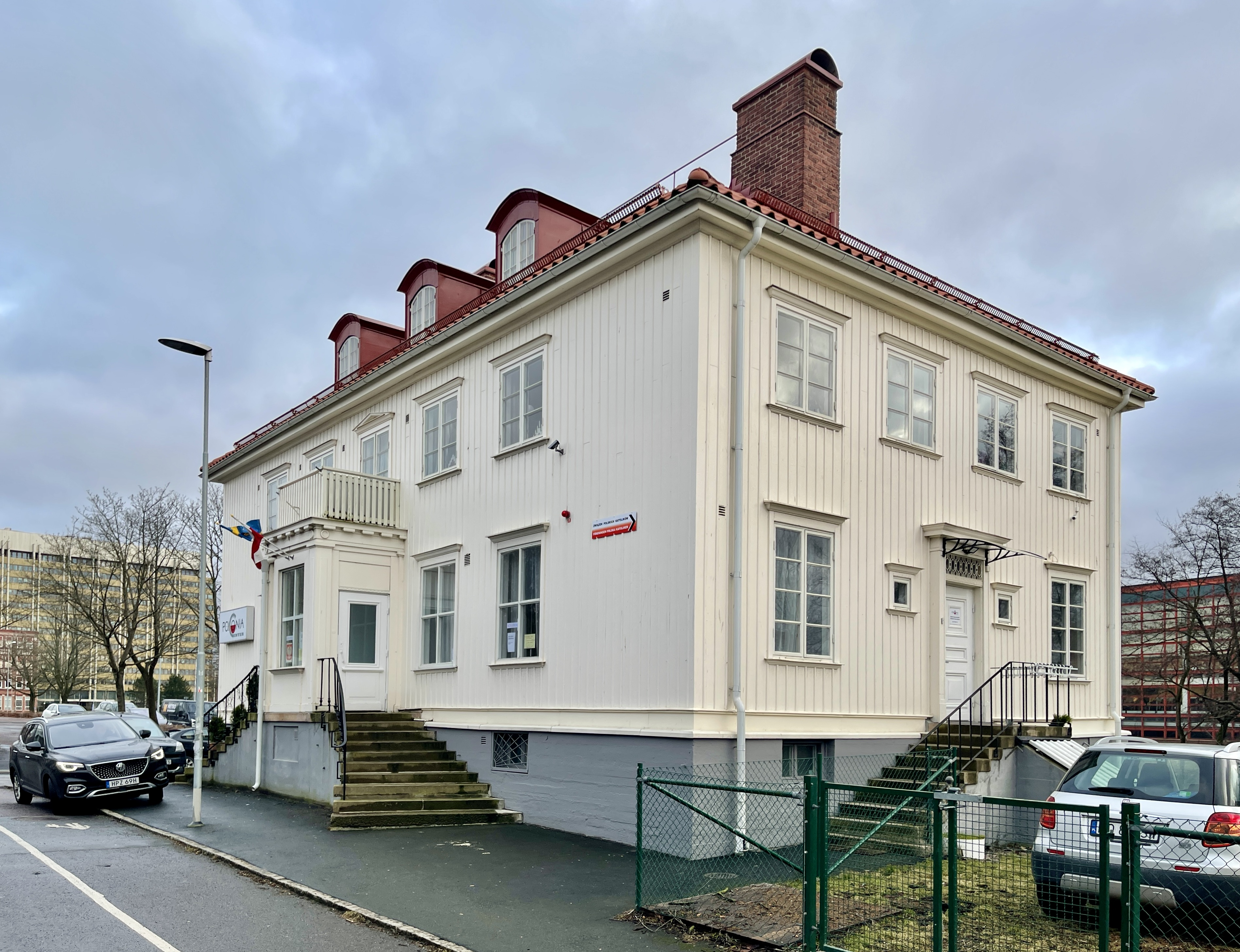
Polish community center in Gothenburg

During World War II, the Polish resistance, in cooperation with Polish outposts in Sweden, organized escapes of Poles from German-occupied Poland to Sweden by sea.

Like only the United Kingdom and Ireland, Sweden let Poles work in the country once Poland joined the European Union in 2004. The number of Poles in Sweden has been estimated to be around 118,060 people, 100,062 of who were born in Poland and 17,998 with both of their parents being born in Poland. Poles are thus Sweden's fifth-largest immigrant group, after Finns, Iraqis, former Yugoslavs (Bosnians, Croats, Serbs) and Syrians. Most of them are guest workers who have been invited to Sweden since 1990 by contracts with the Swedish government. Most Polish residents live in Stockholm, and the rest live south of the city, toward the Baltic Sea. Historically, Poland and Sweden had some cultural exchange.

=== Switzerland ===
Like the Polish community of Finland, some Polish diasporans from Germany were come from the Rhine-Ruhr basin, as immigrant workers to Switzerland. The biggest Polish diaspora community lives in Northern Switzerland.

=== Turkey ===
In 1842, Prince Adam Czartoryski founded the village of Adampol for Polish immigrants who came to Turkey after the failed November Uprising. The village still exists and is now called Polonezköy (Turkish for Polish Village). It is the main centre of the small but historic Polish community in Turkey. The Polish minority in Turkey has been estimated to be around 4,000 people. However, it is higher than the Turkish census indicates because of Turkified Poles who marry Turks. For example, Leyla Gencer's mother was Atiye Çeyrekgil, who was born Alexandra Angela Minakovska and converted to Islam after the death of her husband. Also, Nazım Hikmet Ran's mother, Ayşe Celile Hanım, was a descendant of Mustafa Celaleddin Pasha, who was born as Konstantin Borzecki in 1826. He immigrated to Ottoman Empire after Greater Poland Uprising and embraced Islam in 1848. He later became an Ottoman General and died in 1876.

=== Ukraine ===
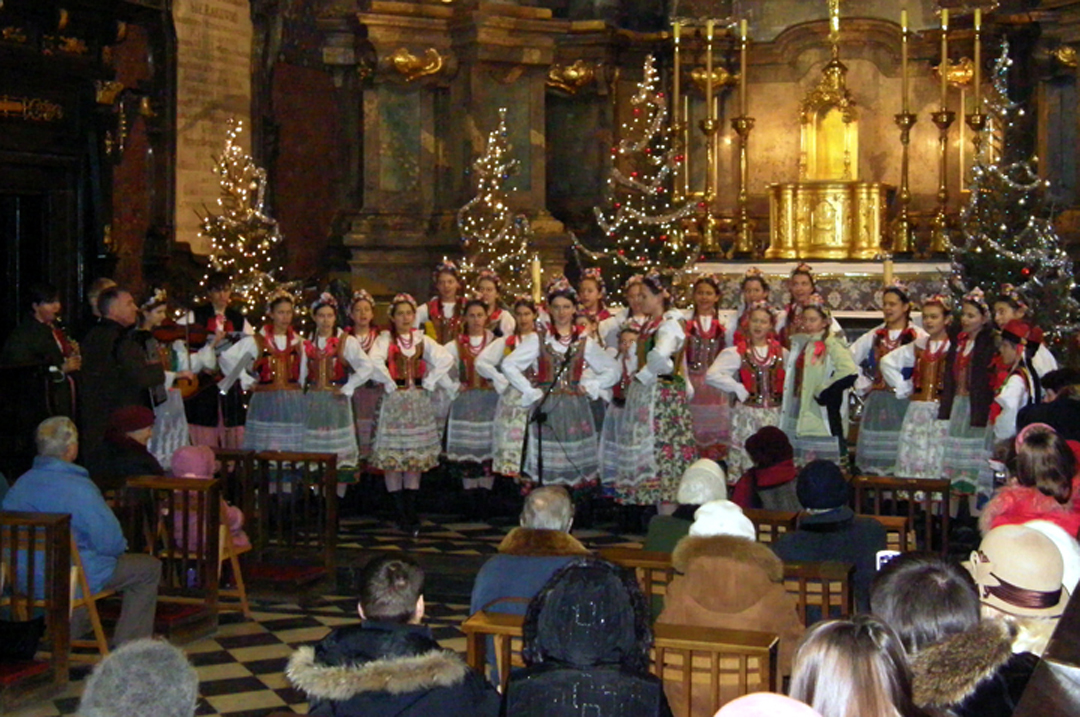
Concert of Polish Children Choir in the Lviv Roman Catholic cathedral

According to the 2001 Ukrainian census, 144,130 Poles were residing in the country.

Poles began settling in the territory of present Ukraine in the 14th century, after Red Ruthenia had become part of the Kingdom of Poland. The number of Poles in Ukraine gradually increased over the centuries, but after World War II, it drastically decreased, as a result of the Soviet mass deportation of the Poles in Ukraine to Siberia and other eastern regions of the USSR as well as a campaign of ethnic cleansing, which was carried out in the early 1940s by Ukrainian nationalists in the western part of the country (see Massacres of Poles in Volhynia). There was a Polish Autonomous District near Zhytomyr that was created in 1926, but it was disbanded in 1935 and its Polish inhabitants were either murdered or deported to Kazakhstan. The majority of those who survived the war in Ukraine were forcibly deported to the former eastern territories of Germany after Poland was shifted to the west by the Allied Potsdam Agreement after World War II.

=== United Kingdom ===
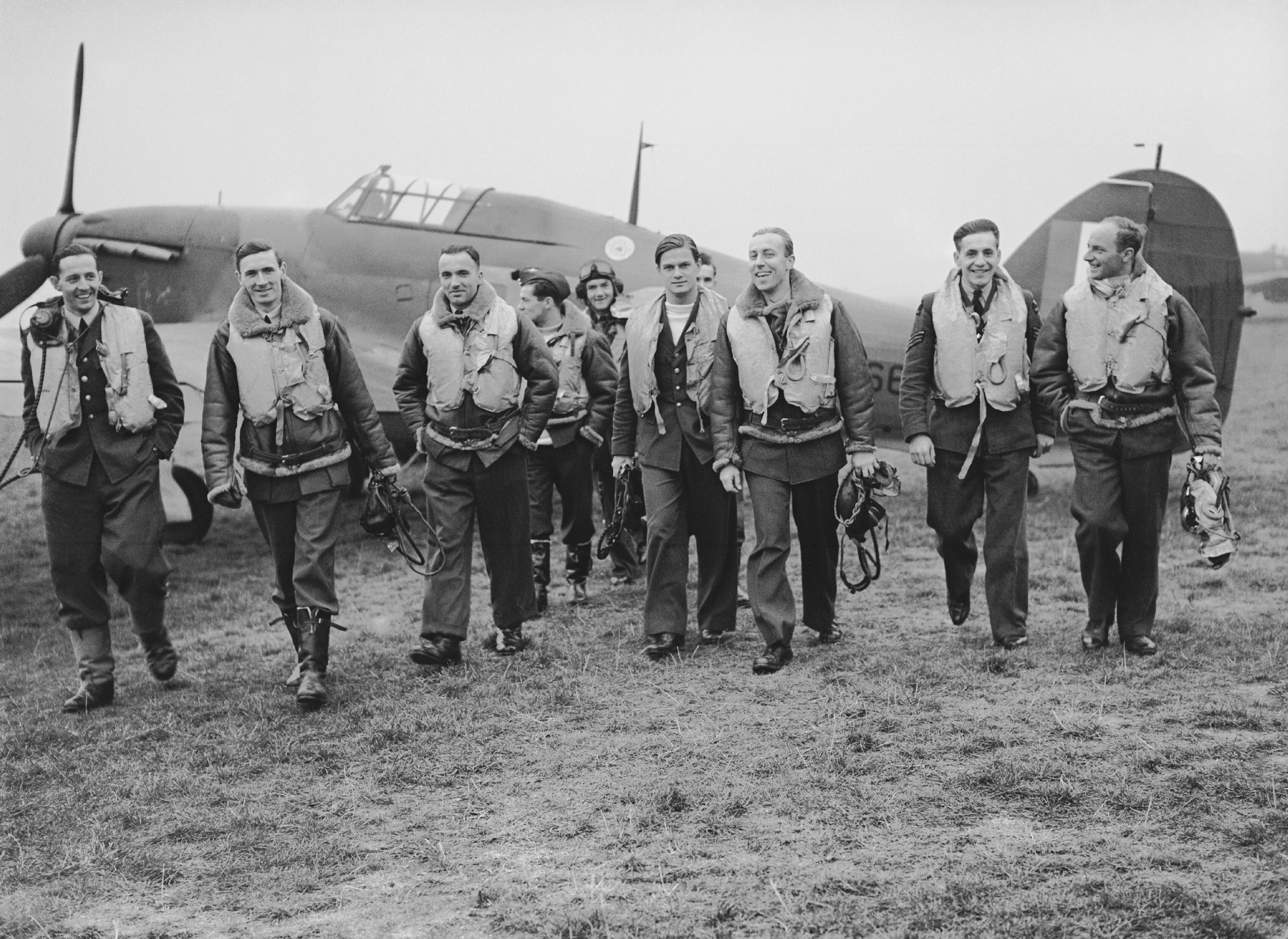
Pilots of No. 303 Polish Fighter Squadron with one of their Hurricanes during the Battle of Britain, October 1940

It was only after the First World War that Poles settled in large numbers in London – many from the Prisoner of War camps in Alexandra Palace and Feltham. During the Second World War many Poles came to the United Kingdom as political émigrés and to join the Polish Armed Forces in the West being recreated there. When the Second World War ended, a Communist government was installed in Poland and was hostile to servicemen returning from the West. Many soldiers refused to return to Poland, and around 150,000, after occupying resettlement camps, later settled in the UK. The Polish Government in London was not dissolved until 1991 when a freely elected president took office in Warsaw.

After Poland entered the European Union in May 2004, Poles gained the right to work in some other EU countries. While France and Germany put in place temporary controls to curb Central European migration, the United Kingdom (along with only Sweden and Ireland) did not impose restrictions. Many young Poles have come to work in the UK since then.

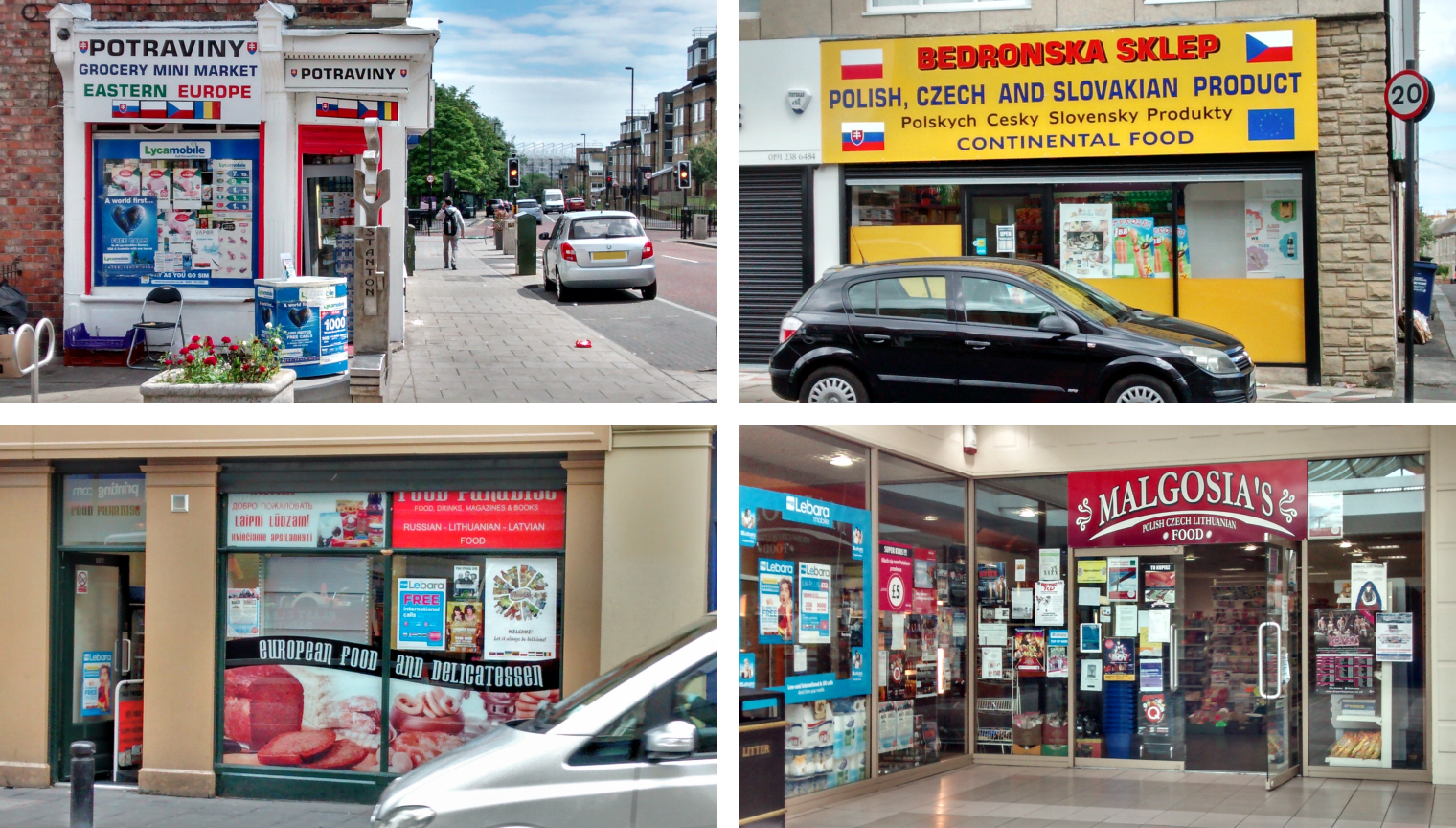
After the 2004 EU enlargement, Polish shops have cropped up in many parts of the United Kingdom and Ireland.

Estimates for the total number of people now living in the UK and born in Poland or of Polish descent vary significantly. There were an estimated 831,000 Polish-born residents in 2015 and one million by 2017. Other than London, Poles have settled in Southampton in Hampshire, Manchester, Bolton and Bury in Greater Manchester and Chorley in Lancashire. There are also large concentrations in Bradford, Leeds, Coventry and Nottingham, as well as South Yorkshire, South Wales, Herefordshire, Rugby, Banbury, Slough, Redditch and Swindon.

The 2008 financial crisis in the UK and the growing economy in Poland reduced the economic incentive for Poles to migrate to the UK. By the last quarter of 2008, it was claimed by the IPPR that up to half of those that had come to the UK to work may have returned home. However, the 2011 UK Census also indicates that it was probably never true.

According to the UK Office for National Statistics, Poland had overtaken India as the most common overseas country of birth for foreign-born people living in the United Kingdom in 2015.

== North America ==
The United States and Canada were the major focus of Polish political and economic migration since 1850 up until the fall of the Iron Curtain and Poland's accession into the EU.

=== Canada ===
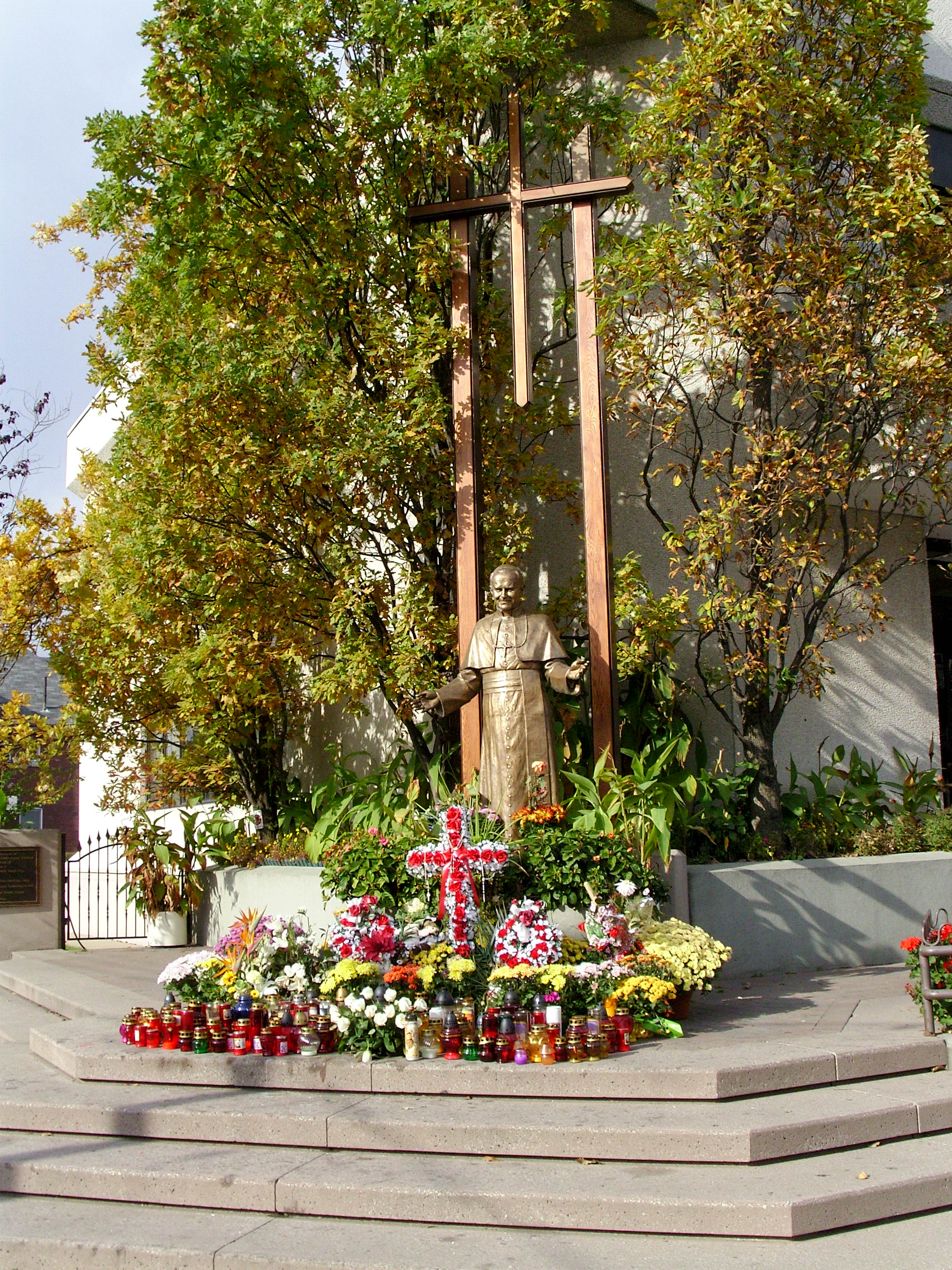
The Pope John Paul II statue in Toronto

The first Polish immigrants came to Canada in the 19th century. Statistics Canada counted 982,820 Canadians of Polish origin in its 2021 Census. 461,090 of Polish Canadians, nearly half, resided in Ontario. One of the largest concentrations of Polish-Canadians is in the Roncesvalles area of Toronto. The area holds an annual Polish Festival, Canada's largest. In the 2021 Census, Alberta had the second largest Polish Canadian population with 169,925 residents. Also of note was British Columbia with 134,635 residents of Polish origin.

The Canadian Polish Congress is an umbrella organization, founded in 1944 by Polish Canadians to coordinate the activities and to articulate the concerns of the community on public policy issues.

=== Haiti ===
About 5,000 Poles fighting in Polish Legions in the Napoleonic armies were sent to fight against the rebelling Haitians. Many of the Poles who were sent there felt it wrong to fight against the Haitians who were fighting for their freedom—just like the Poles in the Napoleonic armies—and some 400 Poles changed sides. After the war, the Haitian constitution stated that because the Poles switched sides and fought for their cause, all Poles could become Haitian citizens. Many of the Poles who were sent to Haiti stayed there. Most of their descendants live in Cazale and Fond-des-Blancs.

=== Mexico ===
The first Polish immigrants to Mexico arrived in the late 19th century. During World War II, Mexico received thousands of refugees from Poland, primarily of Jewish origin, who settled in the states of Chihuahua and Nuevo León.

=== United States ===
Polish ancestry in the US and Canada by area: Over 10% 7% - 9.9% 5% - 6.9% 4% - 4.9% 3% - 3.9% 2% - 2.9% below 2%

The first Polish settlement in the United States was founded in Panna Maria, Texas in 1854. Over the second half of the 19th century and into the beginning of the 20th century, a period known as the Gilded Age, Polish migration to the United States surged to over 2 million. Many of these Poles were temporary economic migrants who worked for several years in the United States before returning home with their savings. This first wave of immigration ended with World War I and the subsequent establishment of the Second Polish Republic in 1918. After World War II several hundred thousand Polish refugees settled in the United States after the Federal government passed the Displaced Persons Act in 1948 and the Refugee Relief Act in 1953. The collapse of the Polish People's Republic in 1989 led to another wave of Polish emigration to the United States.

The United States Census Bureau published an infographic entitled Detailed Races and Ethnicities in the United States and Puerto Rico: 2020 Census. This data source showed that the number of Americans who cited their ethnic group as Polish was 2,686,362 alone and 8,599,601 alone or in any combination in 2020. The Polish American population is concentrated around the Great Lakes and Mid-Atlantic. There are four states of note. Illinois counted 352,882 in the alone category and 857,583 in the alone or in any combination category. The second highest ranking state for the number of Polish Americans in 2020 was New York at 274,580 alone and 788,624 in any combination. Michigan contained the third largest population in the 2020 Census with 256,398 in the alone group and 752,515 in the any combination group. The fourth state of note was Pennsylvania with 206,264 alone and 710,565 in any combination.

The United States Census Bureau also estimates language use through its American Community Survey. The most recent data release is Detailed Languages Spoken at Home and Ability to Speak English for the Population 5 Years and Over: 2017–2021. This survey showed that 529,300 Americans spoke Polish. Notable concentrations by state were Illinois at 174,400 Polish speakers, New York with 85,160 speakers, and New Jersey with 61,480 speakers.

Ever since the founding of the first settlement in Panna Maria, Polish Americans have been very active in the Roman Catholic church. The Central Archives of American Polonia at the Orchard Lake Schools is a research center that compiles data about the history of Christianity among Polish Americans. This research center estimates that Polish Americans established approximately 1,000 parishes of a Polish character during the history of the United States. However, many of these parishes have merged or closed. In large urban centers like Chicago and Detroit, some churches were built at a monumental scale and are classified as Polish cathedral style even if they are not necessarily cathedrals. These churches were built according to architectural styles from different periods in Poland's history. This method of architecture is known as historicism. Another prominent Christian group is the Polish National Catholic Church which separated from the Roman Catholic church in 1897. A notable proportion of Polish Americans are Jews. World Agudath Israel was formed in Poland in 1912. Its American affiliate, Agudath Israel of America, is an umbrella organization for Orthodox Jews.

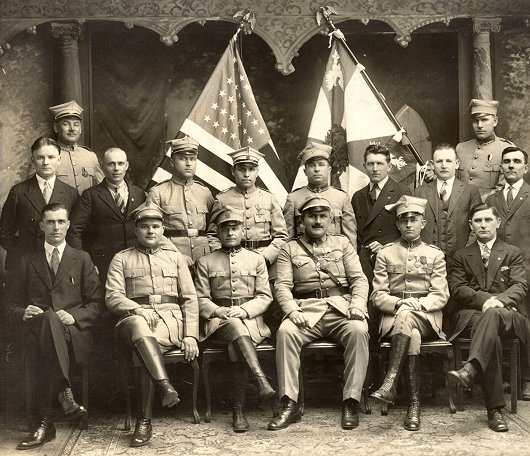
SWAP Branch #57 in Elizabeth, New Jersey in 1928.

Polish Americans have demonstrated a strong interest in the sovereignty of Poland. During World War I, notable numbers of Polish Americans joined the United States Armed Forces. The veterans associations from this conflict merged in 1931 to create the Polish Legion of American Veterans. Some Polish Americans, many of whom were members of the Polish Falcons of America, served in the Blue Army during World War I. When Poland regained its independence in 1918, the Blue Army merged into the Polish Land Forces. In 1944 Polish Americans founded the Polish American Congress (PAC) to support a free and sovereign Poland. Key accomplishments of this advocacy organization were the admission of displaced Poles to the United States after World War II, humanitarian efforts to Poland during the communist era, and the admission of Poland to NATO in 1999.

== South America ==
There has been political and economic migration of Poles to South America since the mid-19th century. The largest number went to Brazil, followed by Argentina.

=== Argentina ===
In Argentina, Poles are one of the most significant minorities, with around 500,000. The Parliament of Argentina has declared June 8 to be Polish Settlers' Day.

=== Brazil ===
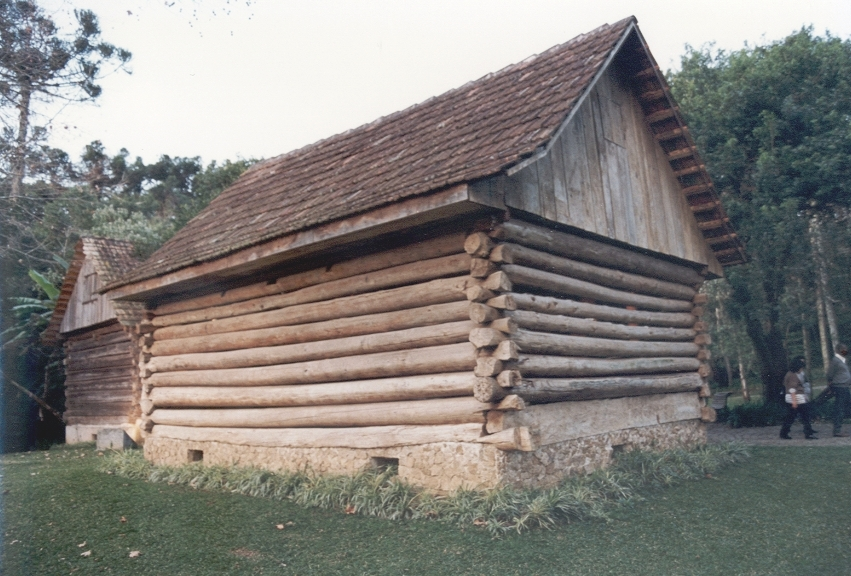
Polish old architecture in Curitiba.

The number of people of Polish descent in Brazil is estimated at 800,000 to two million. Most Polish Brazilians are Catholic, but there are Jews and nonreligious minorities. The oldest (1871) and largest concentration of Poles is in the city of Curitiba, Paraná. Another large communities is to be found in Rio Grande do Sul and Espírito Santo. Both are in the South and Southeastern Regions.

=== Chile ===
A small number of Poles came to Chile. The first came during the Napoleonic Wars. In the early 20th century, there were around 300 Poles in Chile, but they were considered Germans. After World War II, from 1947 to 1951, around 1,500 Poles, mostly Zivilarbeitero as well as some former soldiers and Nazi concentration camp inmates settled in Chile, and in 1949, the Association of Poles in Chile was founded. An estimate of 45,000 ethnic Poles live in Chile. Most live in Santiago de Chile. One of the notable Polish Chileans is Ignacy Domeyko.

=== Colombia ===
It is estimated that around 3,000 Poles live in Colombia, mostly in Bogotá.

=== Uruguay ===
Polish immigration in Uruguay brought Poles to settle in the late 19th and early 20th centuries. An estimated 10,000–50,000 Polish descendants are thought to live in Uruguay, mostly in Montevideo, the capital. Often, Poles came when the Germans and the Russians ruled Poland and so were known as "Germans" or "Russians".

=== Venezuela ===
The Polish colony in Venezuela is well dispersed throughout the country, but most of the Poles and their descendants live in big cities like Caracas, Maracaibo and Valencia.

== Oceania ==
=== Australia ===
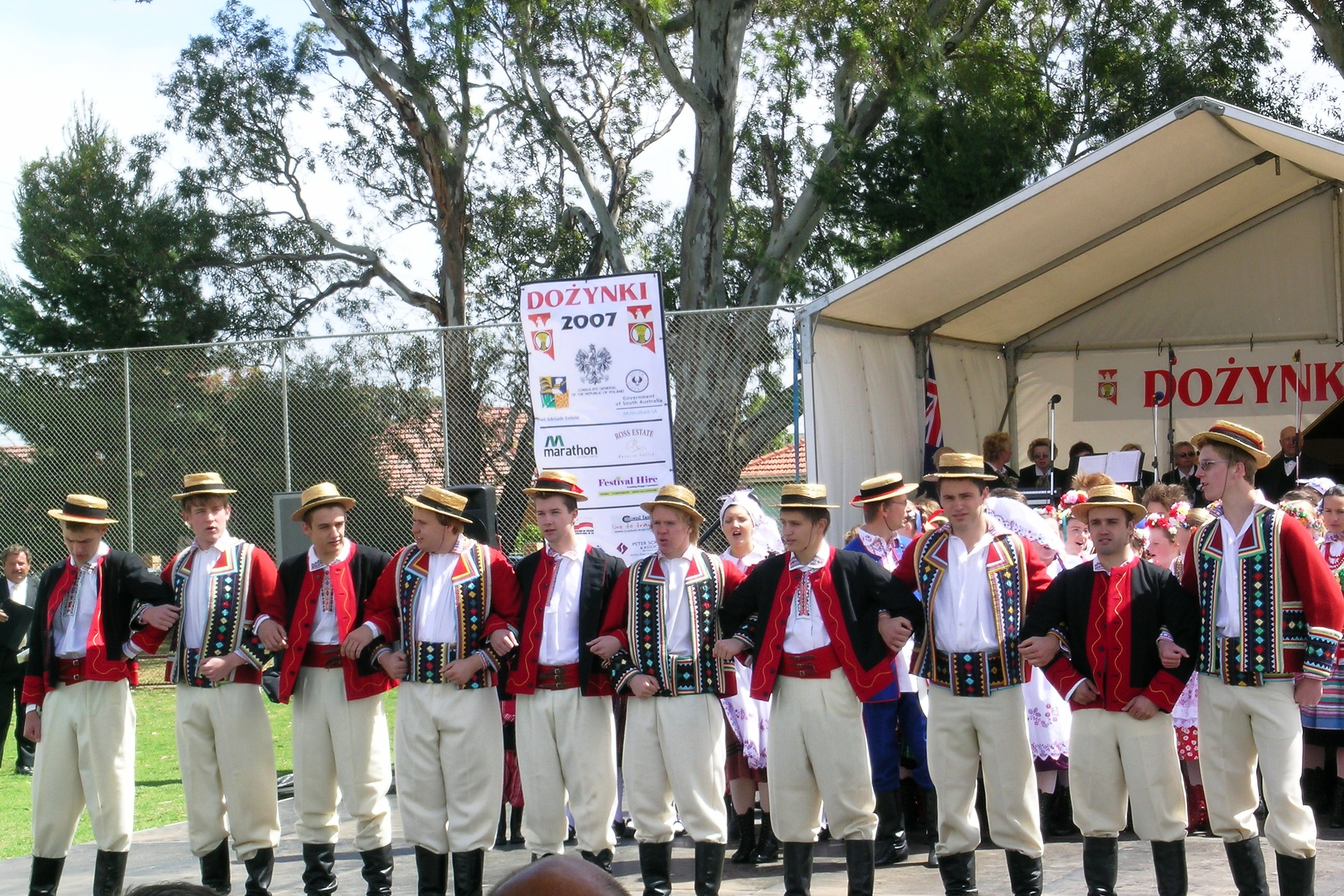
Polish Dożynki Festival in Adelaide, South Australia

The first Polish settlers arrived in South Australia in 1856. After World War II, many displaced persons migrated from Poland to Australia, including soldiers from the Polish Independent Carpathian Brigade (the "Rats of Tobruk"). Between 1947 and 1954, over 50,000 Polish individuals migrated to Australia, seeking refuge after many were displaced during World War II.

There are now 45,884 Polish-born Australians according to the 2021 census.

According to the 2021 census, there are 209,284 Polish Australians.

=== New Zealand ===
In 1944, more than 700 Polish orphans, survivors of forced resettlement of Poles to Soviet Siberia, and their caregivers were temporarily resettled at a refugee camp at Pahiatua, New Zealand. It was initially planned for the children to return to Poland after World War II ended, but as they had no homes or families to return to, they were eventually allowed to stay in New Zealand after the end of the war.

At the 2013 census, Polish New Zealanders numbered 1,944 by birth and 2,163 by ethnicity; of them, 42 percent lived in the Auckland Region and 23 percent in the Wellington Region.

=== Papua New Guinea ===
According to estimates from 2007, some 20 Poles lived in Papua New Guinea, mostly Polish Catholic missionaries and nuns, and physicians.

== Asia ==
=== Armenia ===
The first Poles in Armenia were merchants in the 16th century, while Polish Catholic missionaries have inhabited the country since the 17th century. According to estimates from 2007, some 1,200 Poles lived in Armenia.

=== Azerbaijan ===
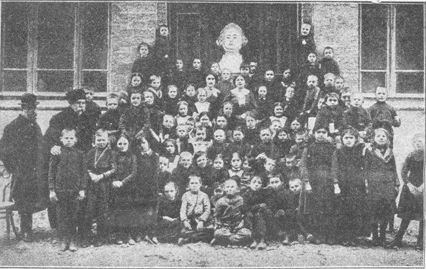
Students and teachers of Polish School in Baku, 1903

In nation, there is a long history of Poles in Azerbaijan (Polish: Polacy w Azerbejdżanie, Azerbaijani: Azərbaycan polyakları). However the current Polish population of the Republic of Azerbaijan is smaller than in former times, the number of people of Polish descent in Baku is around 2,000 and several thousand self-identified Poles live in Azerbaijan. Poles as an ethnic group have lived in Azerbaijan for centuries. The Russian Empire included Azerbaijan and parts of Poland during the 19th century, this was a large cause of the Polish minority in Azerbaijan.

=== China ===
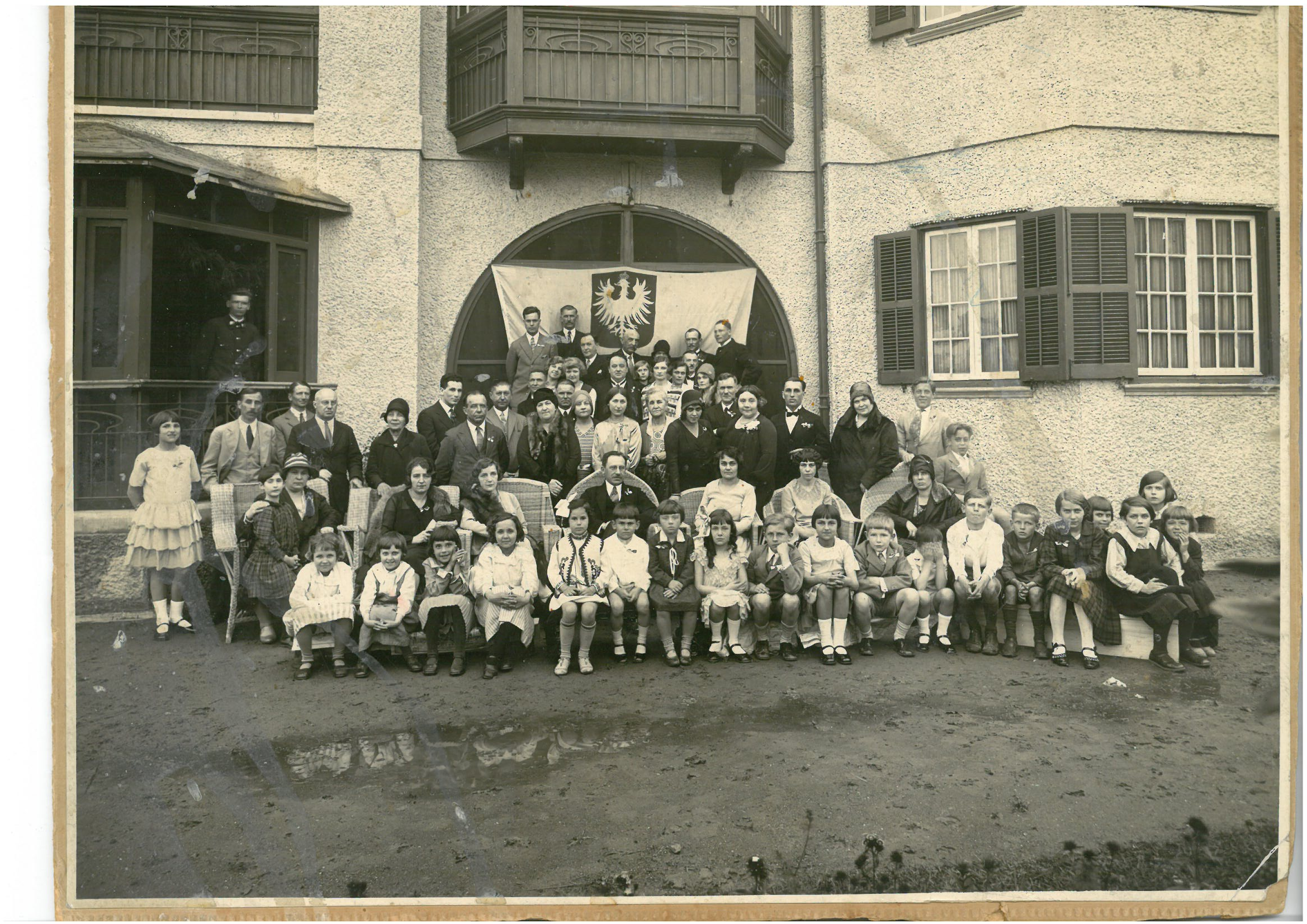
Poles in Shanghai, c. 1931

Polish presence in China dates back to the 17th century, the first Poles in China being Polish missionaries and scholars. Eventually, Poles made contributions in the fields of medicine and healthcare, developed infrastructure and industry, introduced sugar beet cultivation to China and established the country's first brewery. The most vibrant Polish communities were centered in Harbin and Shanghai, however, most left China after both world wars. According to estimates from 2012, some 1,000 Poles lived in China, mostly in the cities of Beijing, Guangzhou, Hong Kong and Shanghai.

=== Georgia ===
Polish presence in Georgia dates back to the 18th century. Poles made great contributions in the fields of architecture, geography, arts, botany and zoology in Georgia. According to estimates from 2007, some 6,000 Poles lived in Georgia.

=== India ===
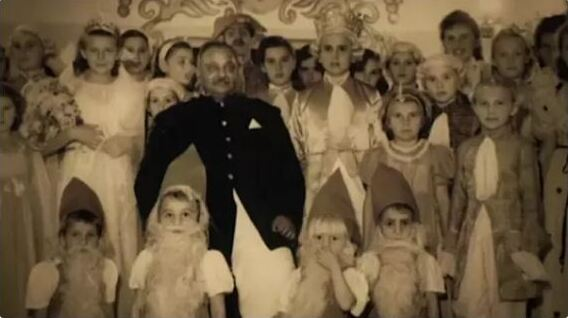
Maharaja Digvijaysinhji Ranjitsinhji Jadeja with Polish children in 1943

The Indian maharaja Digvijaysinhji Ranjitsinhji, following the news of Poland being divided by the Soviet Union and Nazi Germany at the World War II, had welcomed a large number of Polish refugees, mostly children. They were the first Polish group to be in India. After the war, a small number of Poles decided to stay, forming the first Polish diaspora group in India.

=== Israel ===
In the early years of Zionism, Jewish immigrants from Poland (then divided between Austria-Hungary, The Kingdom of Prussia and the Russian Empire) were a significant part of the ideologically motivated immigration to the then Palestine during the Second Aliya and the Third Aliyah. Many Jews of Polish origin had prominent roles in building up the Yishuv, the autonomous Zionist-oriented Jewish community in Mandatory Palestine from which Israel developed. In the aftermath of the Holocaust, many Jewish Displaced Persons in Europe who eventually got to Israel were also of Polish origin. In later generations, they generally abandoned the Polish and Yiddish languages, in favour of Modern Hebrew. About 4,000 non-Jewish ethnic Poles live in Israel. There are also about 50,000 Jewish immigrants from Poland, with an affinity to the Polish language and culture and about 150,000 of their descendants with very little of that affinity left.

=== Japan ===
1,510 Poles lived in Japan, as of 2023; the majority (915) in Kantō region and Tokyo.

In the 1920s, some 300 Poles lived in Japan, mostly in the Karafuto Prefecture.

=== Kazakhstan ===
The first Pole to travel to Kazakhstan was probably Benedict of Poland, sent as part of the delegation of Pope Innocent IV to the Khagan Güyük of the Mongol Empire. Later more Poles came to Kazakhstan during the Post-Soviet times. Today these Poles live in Karaganda with a population of 47,300 people.

=== Kyrgyzstan ===
Polish presence in Kyrgyzstan dates back to the 19th century, with the community growing from 240 in 1890 to 1,961 in 1979. According to estimates from 2007, some 1,400 Poles lived in Kyrgyzstan.

=== Philippines ===
During Spanish colonization, most Poles immigrated to the Philippines mostly for the Catholic clergy missionary work in other Asian countries. One of these Polish men was Wojciech Męciński a Jesuit missionary from Kraków. Later on, other Poles came to the Philippines but mostly they were Polish Americans, including Michael Sendzimir, a second lieutenant who worked in the 98th Infantry Division during World War II. Today the Polish community in the Philippines has about 93 people. Some of these Poles today come to the Philippines as immigrants, ex-pats, foreign exchange students, or settled down in the Philippines by their Filipino spouses. some members of the Polish community in the Philippines, include Robert Jaworski a basketball player and an ex-senator, Zaldy Zshornack (1937–2002) and an Australian Polish man Peter Pysk founded a Polish restaurant called Babci Kuchnia. Most of the Poles live in Metro Manila, and the Polish community is the fourth-largest Central European community after the German, Hungarian, and Albanian communities in the country.

=== Saudi Arabia ===
Some 500 Poles live in Saudi Arabia, mostly educated professionals, according to estimates from 2023.

=== Singapore ===
Some 1,500 to 2,000 Poles live in Singapore, mostly educated employees of the maritime sector, international corporations and banks, plus scientists, according to estimates from 2023.

=== Tajikistan ===
According to the 2010 census, 23 Poles lived in Tajikistan, although the diaspora was much more numerous, with over 700 people prior to the Tajikistani Civil War.

=== Thailand ===
In the 1920s some 20 Poles lived in Thailand, a number which grew to 100 by 2007, according to estimates.

=== Turkmenistan ===
Polish presence in Turkmenistan dates back to the 19th century. According to the 1995 census, 501 Poles lived in Turkmenistan.

=== Uzbekistan ===
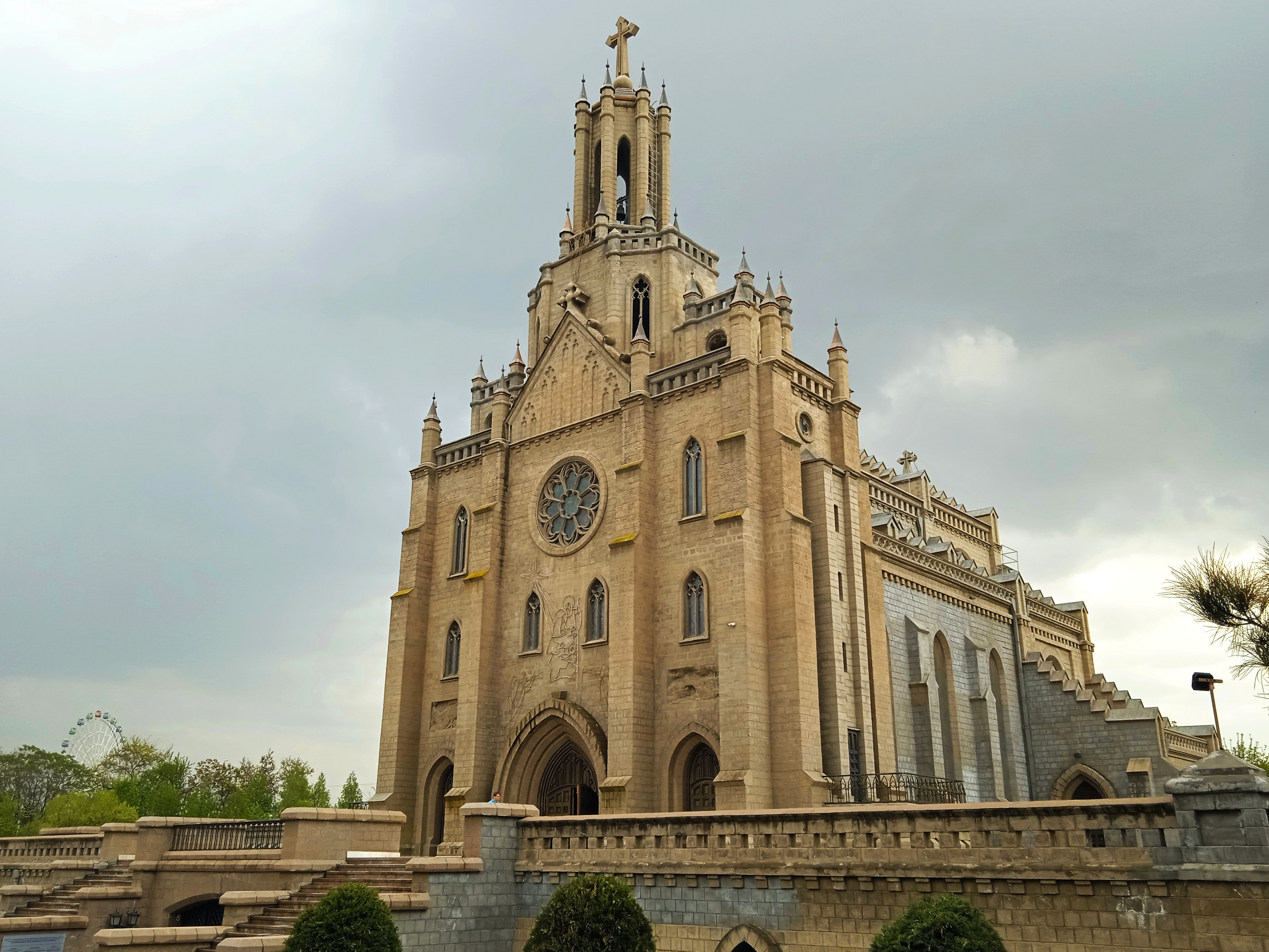
Sacred Heart Cathedral, Tashkent, also known as the Polish Church

Polish presence in Uzbekistan dates back to the 19th century. According to estimates from 2023, some 2,000 Poles and people of Polish descent lived in Uzbekistan.

=== Vietnam ===
Some 200 to 300 Poles lived in Vietnam, according to 2023 estimates, including managers, entrepreneurs and teachers.

== Africa ==
=== Senegal ===
A number of Polish missionaries worked in Senegal, starting with Jan Krzyżanowski, who lived there from 1932 until his death in 1963, making efforts to discover cures for yellow fever and other tropical diseases. Further missionaries worked in service of local Senegalese communities as teachers, caretakers or directors of schools and boarding schools, nurses in clinics and hospitals, etc.

According to estimates from 2023, some 55 Poles lived in Senegal.

=== South Africa ===
According to the Council of Polonia in South Africa, 25,000 to 30,000 Poles live there. The Polish community in South Africa dates to World War II when the South African government agreed to the settlement of 12,000 Polish soldiers as well as around 500 Polish orphans who were survivors of forced resettlement of Poles to Soviet Siberia. More Poles came in the 1970s and 1980s, with several of them specialists coming for work contracts and deciding to stay there. Magda Wierzycka, who is Polish, is the wealthiest woman in South Africa.

=== Tanzania ===
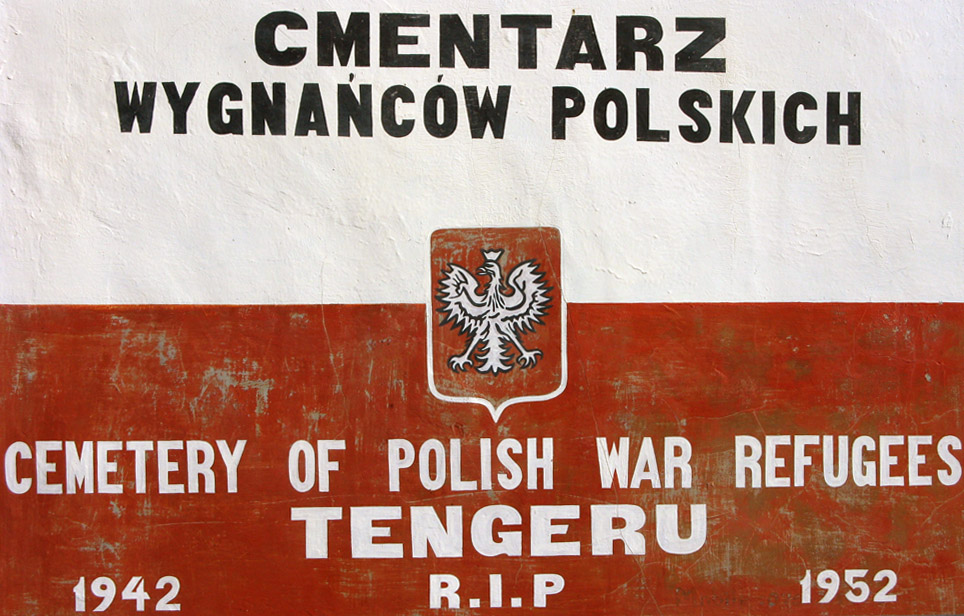
Plaque at the Cemetery of Polish War Refugees in Tengeru

During World War II, 6,631 Polish refugees escaping the Soviet Union, including 671 men (mostly elders), 3,255 women and 2,705 children, were admitted in the Tanganyika Territory (as of December 1944). After the war, most Poles were repatriated to Europe, and 230 were allowed to stay.

According to estimates from 2007, some 100 Poles lived in Tanzania.

=== Uganda ===
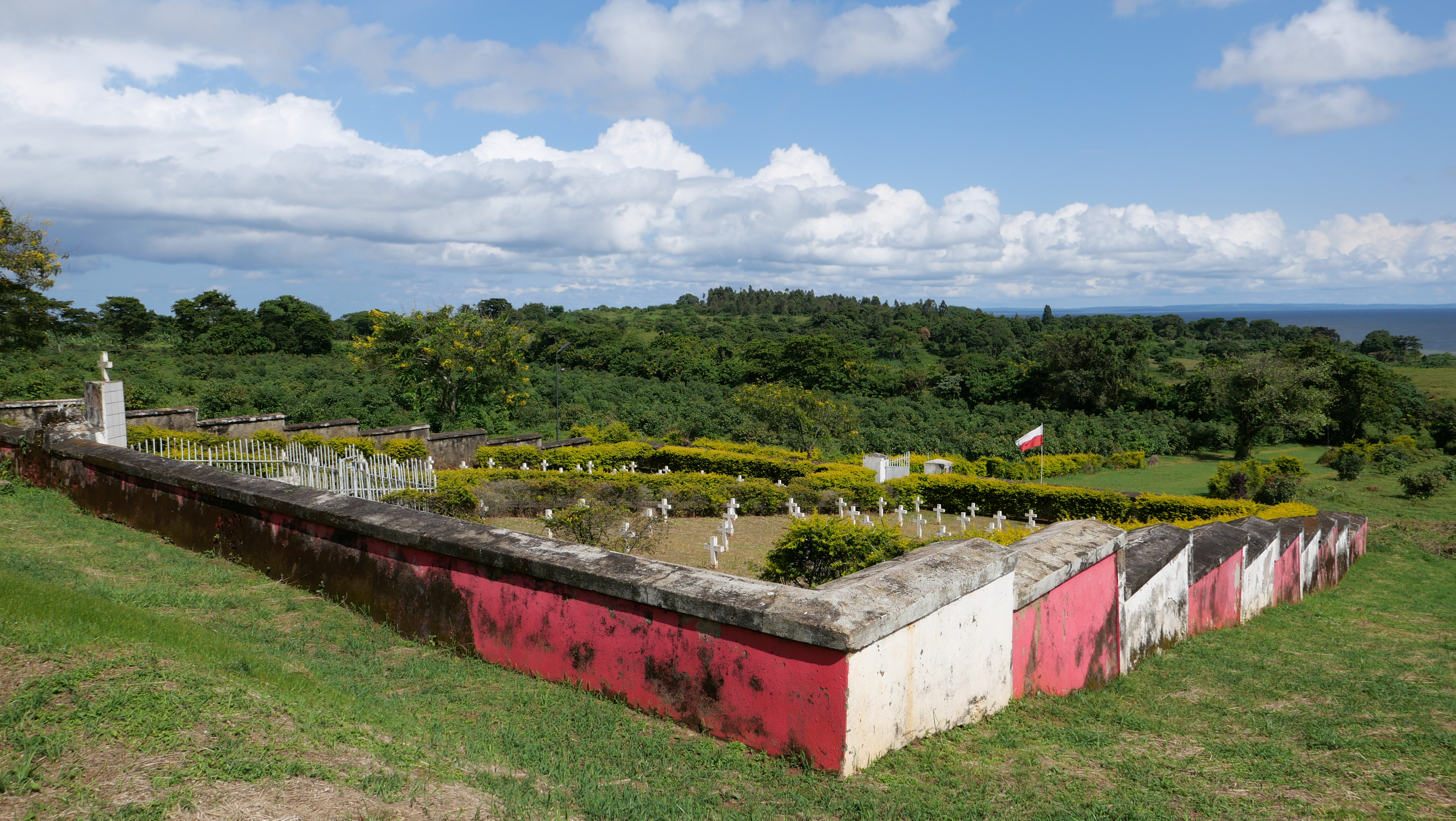
Cemetery of the Polish refugees in Koja, Uganda

During World War II, 6,443 Polish refugees escaping the Soviet Union, including 704 men (mostly elders), 2,833 women and 2,906 children, were admitted in the Protectorate of Uganda (as of December 1944). After the war, the Polish refugees were gradually repatriated to Europe. In 1948, there were still 1,387 Poles in Uganda. The remaining Polish refugees most likely left Uganda by 1952. A preserved remnant of Polish refugees in Uganda is the Our Lady Queen of Poland Catholic Church near Masindi.

According to estimates from 2007, some 100 Poles lived in Uganda.

=== Zambia ===
During World War II, Polish refugees escaping the Soviet Union were admitted in Northern Rhodesia, whose number was 2,894 as of December 1944. After the war, most Poles were repatriated to Europe, except for some 340 people who were allowed to stay.

According to estimates from 2007, some 100 Poles lived in Zambia.

=== Zimbabwe ===
During World War II, Polish refugees escaping the Soviet Union were admitted in Southern Rhodesia, mostly in Rusape and Marondera. As of December 1944, their number was 1,437. After the war, most Poles were repatriated to Europe, some were relocated to Tanganyika, and some 120 stayed.

According to estimates from 2007, some 800 Poles lived in Zimbabwe.

== List of countries by the population of Polish ethnicity ==
Continent	Country	Population	% of country	Criterion
North America	United States (detailed)	8,599,601	2.67%	Detailed Races and Ethnicities in the United States and Puerto Rico: 2020 Census
North America	Canada (detailed)	982,820	2.71%	Statistics Canada: Census Profile, 2021 Census of Population
North America	Mexico (detailed)	15,000	0.1%	
South America	Argentina (detailed)	2,000,000	4%	
South America	Brazil (detailed)	1,800,000	2.5%	
South America	Chile (detailed)	45,000	0.2%	
South America	Venezuela (detailed)	4,000–8,900	0.03%	
Europe	Belarus (detailed)	287,693	3.12%	2019 census
Europe	Czech Republic (detailed)	38,218	0.53%	2021 census (Note: Including 11,416 people declaring the combination of Polish and other nationality. The real number can be higher as it was possible to leave the "nationality" field blank. Percentage is calculated from valid responses only.)
Europe	Denmark (detailed)	56,612	0.94%	As of Q1, 2026; See also: Denmark–Poland relations
Europe	France (detailed)	1,000,000	2%	
Europe	Germany (detailed)	2,257,000	2.73%	2024 microcensus
Europe	Iceland (detailed)	22,691	5.83%	Including only those who were born in Poland. They make up the biggest minority ethnic group in Iceland.
Europe	Ireland (detailed)	122,585	2.7%	
Europe	United Kingdom (detailed)	728,942	1.09%	2021-2022 census; Including 614,344 in England and Wales, 90,736 in Scotland, and 23,862 in Northern Ireland (note that in Northern Ireland this is defined by one's national identity instead of ethnicity).
Europe	Spain (detailed)	69,353	0.15%	
Europe	Sweden (detailed)	150,798	1.43%	As of 2025
Europe	Switzerland (detailed)	39,000	0.44%	
Europe	Latvia (detailed)	35,146	1.95%	As of 2025
Europe	Lithuania (detailed)	183,421	6.64%	2021 census
Europe	Russia (detailed)	22,024	0.02%	2021 census; See also: Poles in the Soviet Union
Europe	Ukraine (detailed)	144,130	0.3%	2001 census
Africa	Ghana (detailed)	24,999	0.07%	
Africa	South Africa (Polish South Africans)	25,000	0.042%	
Asia	Cyprus (detailed)	2,459	0.27%	2021 census
Asia	Israel (detailed)		7%	See also: Polish Jews in Israel
Asia	Kazakhstan (detailed)	35,319	0.18%	2021 census
Asia	Lebanon (detailed)	5,000	0.01%	
Asia	Philippines (detailed)			
Oceania	Australia (detailed)	209,281	0.88%	2021 census
Oceania	New Zealand (detailed)	3,360	0.07%	2023 census
Total in diaspora		≈19,000,000		
Europe	Poland (detailed)	37,595,069	98.87%	2021 census
Total worldwide		≈56,000,000		

== Politics ==
=== 2025 Polish presidential election ===
Voivodeship	Trzaskowski KO		Nawrocki PiS		Mentzen Confederation		Braun KKP		Hołownia TD		Zandberg Razem		Biejat The Left		Stanowski Ind.		Senyszyn SLD		Jakubiak WR		Bartoszewicz Ind.		Maciak RDiP		Woch BS	
Voivodeship	Votes	%	Votes	%	Votes	%	Votes	%	Votes	%	Votes	%	Votes	%	Votes	%	Votes	%	Votes	%	Votes	%	Votes	%	Votes	%
Abroad and ships	171,536	36.82	74,844	16.07	77,229	16.58	51,552	11.07	15,971	3.43	30,147	6.47	28,466	6.11	4,184	0.90	5,800	1.24	2,932	0.63	2,054	0.44	917	0.20	235	0.05
Poland	6,147,797	31.36	5,790,804	29.54	2,902,448	14.81	1,242,917	6.34	962,930	4.99	952,832	4.86	829,361	4.23	243,479	1.24	214,198	1.09	150,698	0.77	95,640	0.49	36,371	0.19	18,338	0.09
Source: National Electoral Commission

Voivodeship	Nawrocki PiS		Trzaskowski KO	
Voivodeship	Votes	%	Votes	%
Abroad and ships	220,704	36.51	383,827	63.49
Poland	10,606,877	50.89	10,237,286	49.11
Source: National Electoral Commission

== See also ==
- Demographics of Poland
- Great Emigration
- Hotel Lambert
- Polish Charter
- World Polonia Games

== Bibliography ==
- Marek Żukow-Karczewski, Polonia zagraniczna w czasach II Rzeczypospolitej (Foreign Polonia during the Second Polish Republic), "Życie Literackie", No. 33, 1989, p. 10. (in Polish)
- Wróbel, Janusz (2003). Uchodźcy polscy ze Związku Sowieckiego 1942–1950 (in Polish). Łódź: Instytut Pamięci Narodowej. ISBN 978-83-7629-522-0.
- Wyszyński, Robert; Leszczyński, Karol (2023). Atlas Polaków na świecie (in Polish). Warszawa: Instytut Pokolenia. ISBN 978-83-968580-3-0.
