= Conjunto Virginia Opazo =

National monument of Chile

Coordinates: 33.4493°S 70.6691°W

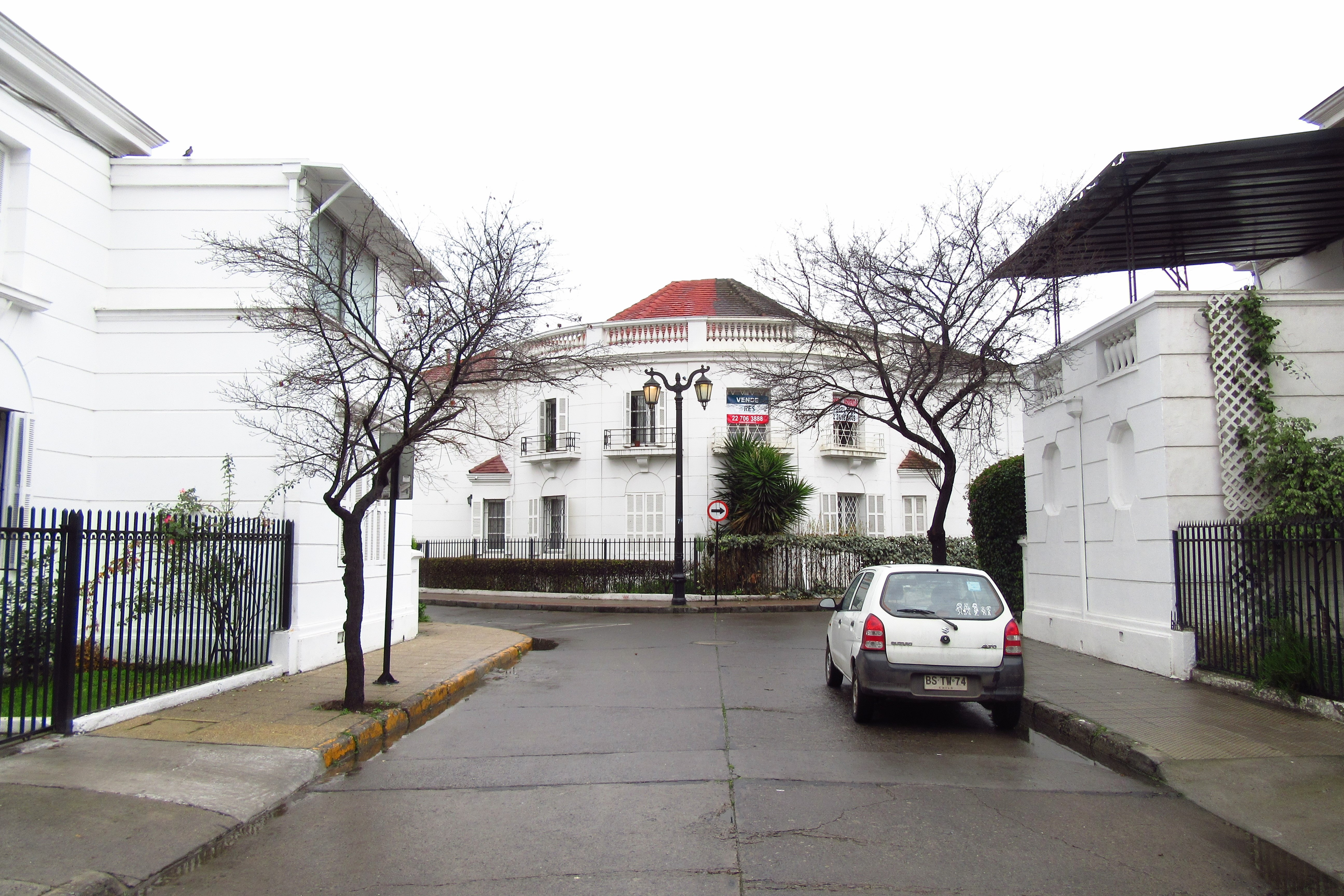
- Interactive map of Conjunto Virginia Opazo

Design and construction
- Architect: Luciano Kulczewski

The Conjunto Virginia Opazo is an architectural ensemble designed by architect Luciano Kulczewski, which is located in the Barrio República, in downtown Santiago, Chile. It consists of 33 two-story terraced houses. The residential subdivision was inaugurated in 1944, and was declared as a National Monument of Chile on November 10, 1992, within the category of Zona Típica (Heritage District).

== History ==
The houses were built on the former site of the Quinta Meiggs Palace. That land was originally owned by American businessman Henry Meiggs, which was divided into lots in 1872 to create the Barrio República, with new streets extending south from Alameda to the Club Hípico.

In 1944 the colonel Octavio Soto, at that time a student of the War Academy — which was located at the intersection of the Alameda and España Avenue—, asked the Chilean Army for a loan to buy a parcel of land, which was a part of the old Quinta Meiggs site, to build houses for him and his classmates.

Designed by Luciano Kulczewski, it was inaugurated by the then president Juan Antonio Ríos in 1944. The residents requested that the name of the access street was Octavio Soto, but the rules of the municipality of Santiago required that the name had to be of a deceased person, which led to choice the name of the mother of the colonel, which was Virginia Opazo.

== Description ==
The residential subdivision is roughly bounded by the Alameda, España Avenue, Salvador Sanfuentes Street and República Avenue. The houses are set along Virginia Opazo Street, which is divided by a city block containing some of the houses. The 33 houses have similar facades and were built in the Neoclassical style and painted white, featuring a backyard and a small fenced front garden.

Other two residential subdivisions designed by Kulczewski have been declared Zona Típica. These are the Población Los Castaños (1930), in Independencia, and the Keller Street (1925), in Providencia, both located in the city of Santiago.
