= Polish people in Lebanon =

Regions with significant populations
- Beirut (Greater Beirut) · other areas

Languages
- Polish · Arabic

Religion
- Roman Catholicism · Islam

Polish people in Lebanon may refer to people born in or residing in Lebanon of full or partial Polish origin. They are a small group in Lebanon. Almost all of whom live in Beirut.

== First contacts with Lebanon ==
The first mention of Poles in the areas of modern Lebanon was from the time of the Crusades, which were attended by Polish nobles, as well as numerous pilgrimages to the Holy Land. From this period comes the first recorded pilgrim brother Anselm of the Bernardine order that contains a reference to passing through Lebanon. First described the Lebanese lands Prince Nicholas Krzysztof Radziwill in his diary of the journey to Jerusalem, which took place in the years 1582-1584.

In the 1830s and 1840s Polish Jesuit missionary Maksymilian Stanisław Ryłło was active in Lebanon. In Ghazir Julius Slovak stopped during his trip to the Middle East in 1837.

During the Crimean War Sadyk Pasha formed a Cossack cavalry regiment, composed primarily of Poles. In recognition of the regiment was drafted into the Guard and sent to Lebanon in 1865. The first commander of this department was Jan Gościmiński (Tufan Bey), and his successor was Louis Sas Monasterska (Lufti Bey). After 24 years Polish regiment in Lebanon ceased to exist.

In the years 1902-1907 the Pole Władysław Czajkowski (Muzaffar Pasha) was the governor of Lebanon.

== During WW II ==
In the years 1943-1946 about 6,000 Poles settled in Lebanon, mostly women and children who, through got out of the Soviet Union via Iran and the Middle East. They joined, a small group of Polish citizens who had arrived there in the years 1939-1942 and were living in Beirut. Upon arrival the refugees were under the care of the Polish Legation, representing the official Polish Government in London, recognized as legitimate by the Lebanese authorities.

At the beginning the Poles were accepted in the transit camp in Beirut, and then resettled in Ghazirze, Zuk Mikail, Ajaltun, Baladun, Beit-Chabab, Roumie and Baabdat. It was assumed the school, a small Polish library of about 500 books. There were also hospitals for refugees and the Polish church in Ghazirze. In Bahamdun and Bhannes created Polish spas. From November 1941 Beirut Radio "Levant" broadcast daily programs for the Polish Army in the Middle East, and from February 1942 Polish programs were broadcast twice a day. At the end of the 1940s a Polish cemetery was created by French military units in Beirut, which during the Lebanese Civil War was right next to the "green line" dividing the city and as a result of the bombing was totally destroyed, but was completely renovated in 2010.

== Modern times ==
The Poles who were living for many years in Lebanon did not have the ability to contact each other due to the ongoing civil war from 1975-1990. The situation changed only in 1991 with the creation of "Polish Club", transformed in the next year into "Association " of Polish Community in Lebanon". The main objective of this organization is to maintain the tradition, culture and mother tongue, as well as the behavior of Polish origin of consciousness in children born in Lebanon. The Polish Association also tries to promote Polish culture among the Lebanese people. In 1992, the association "School of Polish Language and Culture" began operations. In March 1997, the first issue of the monthly magazine "Polish cedars" was distributed.

Also, a large role in maintaining contact with their homeland played the Polish Military Contingent, which was stationed in Lebanon in the years 1992-2009. An important event in the life of the Polish Lebanese community was the meeting with Pope John Paul II, during his pilgrimage in May 1997. During the Israeli-Lebanese conflict in 2006, a portion of Poles, mostly women and children, were temporarily evacuated to Poland.
