= Gloria de la Fuente =

Chilean social activist, politician

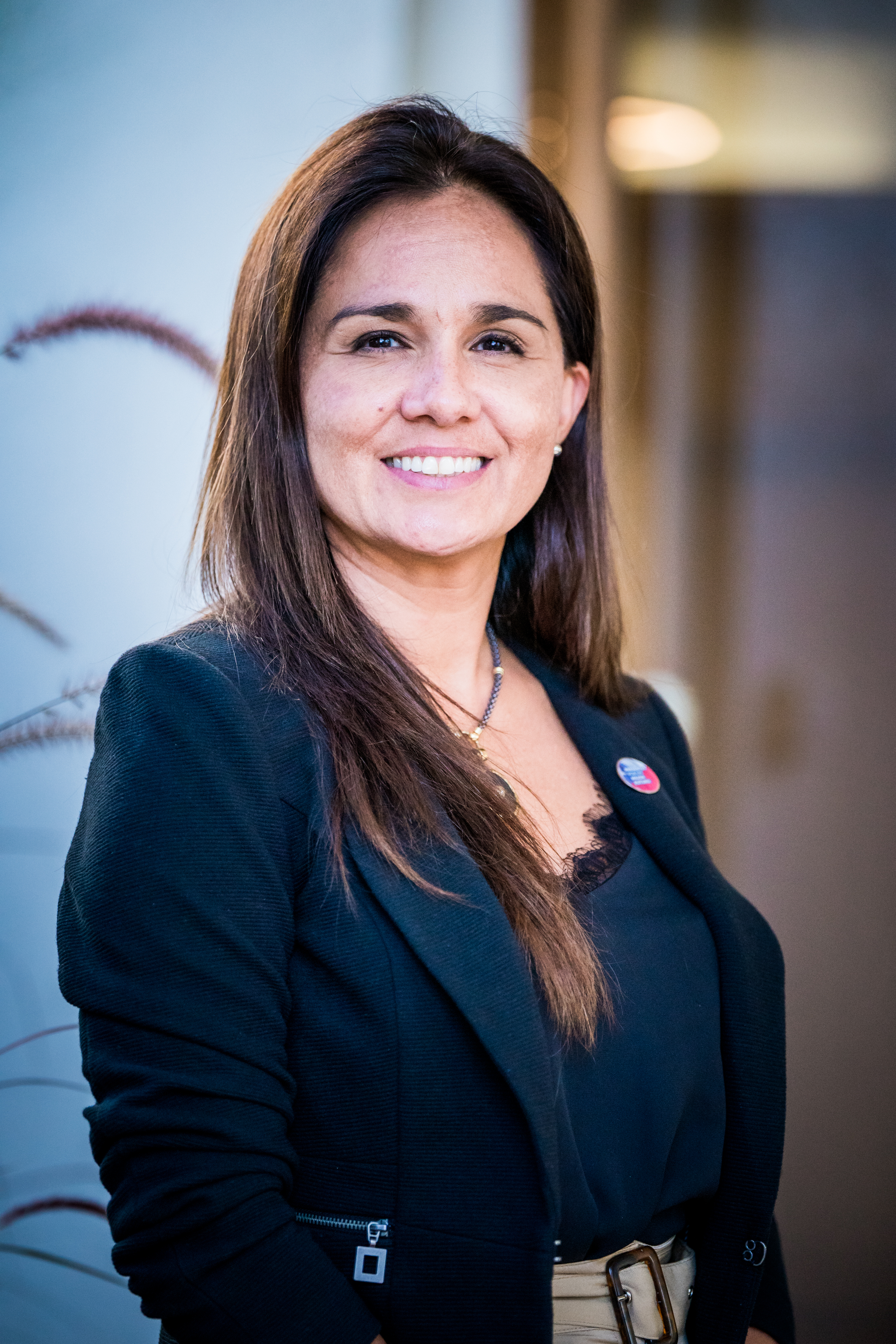
- Undersecretary Gloria de la Fuente in 2023

Undersecretary of Foreign Affairs of Chile
- In office 10 March 2023 – 11 March 2026
- President: Gabriel Boric
- Preceded by: Ximena Fuentes Torrijo

Personal details
- Born: 25 May 1977 (age 48) Santiago, Chile
- Party: Socialist Party of Chile
- Education: University of Chile
- Alma mater: Pontifical Catholic University of Chile
- Occupation: Politician, political scientist
- Website: Official website

Gloria Alejandra de la Fuente González (Santiago, May 25, 1977) is a Chilean politician, political scientist and academic. Since March 10, 2023, she has served as Undersecretary of Foreign Affairs of Chile under the administration of President Gabriel Boric. She previously served as a council member and president of the Council for Transparency.

== Biography ==
She was born into a middle-class family with no political background and grew up in the commune of La Florida. She completed her secondary education at Liceo No. 1 Javiera Carrera, before studying political science at the Pontifical Catholic University of Chile, and later earning a PhD in Social Sciences from the University of Chile.

Her professional career has focused on transparency issues. She served as a consultant and later president of the Council for Transparency, and has also been an international consultant for Eurosocial and the Network for Transparency and Access to Public Information. She worked as a project director at Chile Transparente, the Chilean chapter of Transparency International, and has served on the boards of Fundación Proacceso and Chile 21 Foundation, of which she became president. She has also worked at the Ministry General Secretariat of the Presidency of Chile and was a member of the Permanent Advisory Council for State Reform in Chile.

In academia, she has taught at the University of Chile, Alberto Hurtado University, University of Santiago, Chile, Catholic University of Temuco and Academy of Christian Humanism University.

On March 10, 2023, she was appointed Undersecretary of Foreign Affairs by President Gabriel Boric. Together with the Undersecretary of International Economic Relations, Claudia Sanhueza, and the Minister of Foreign Affairs, Alberto van Klaveren, she was responsible for launching Chile's Feminist Foreign Policy. Her appointment was not without controversy, as she had to resign from her position as president and council member of the Council for Transparency in order to take up the undersecretary post. This created a situation where the council was unable to hold sessions due to the lack of the legally required quorum until her replacement was appointed.
