= Luciano Kulczewski =

Chilean architect (1896–1972)

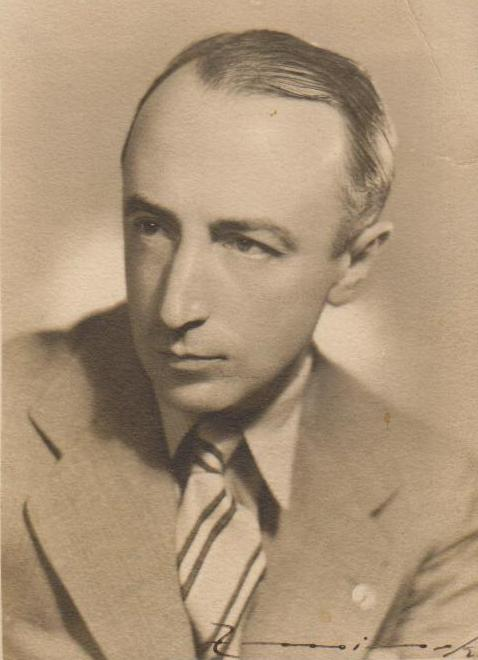
- Born: Luciano Kulczewski García; January 8, 1896; Temuco, Chile
- Died: September 19, 1972 (aged 76)
- Education: University of Chile
- Occupation: Architect
- Buildings: National Headquarters of the College of Architects of Chile; Los Castaños Housing Complex; Entrance to the Funicular of the Metropolitan Park in Santiago; Conjunto Virginia Opazo

Luciano Kulczewski (8 January 1896 – 19 September 1972) was a Chilean architect. He is seen by some as "a pioneer of modern architecture in Chile."

== Early life and career ==
Kulczewski was born to a family of Polish descent. His grand grandfather, Maciej and the grand uncle, also Maciej, fought in the 1830 November Uprising against Russia.

His grandfather Antoni (born Jeziorka, near Warsaw 1806 – died France 1857) was awarded the gold medal of the Caveliers, the Virtuti Militari for his valor during the November Uprising in 1831. Antoni studied road and bridge engineering in France, and had joined the Foreign Legion to participate during the pacification of Algeria. In 1839, Antoni Kulczewski was awarded permanent residency in France for service to his chosen homeland.

Kulczewski's father, Boleslao Eugenio Kulczewski y Lester, was born in 1849 in Algeria, a French colony. He studied civil engineering and mining in Paris and came to Chile in 1872 to work as a coal mining engineer in Lota. He later became the co-founder of the Administration of Public Works. Kulczewski's mother was Luisa García Rodríguez who was born in Concepcion.

== Education ==
Kulczewski attended at Instituto Nacional General José Miguel Carrera, a prestigious public high school of Santiago, where his Spanish teacher was Pedro Aguirre Cerda, former President of Chile from 1938 to 1941. From 1913 to 1919, Kulczewski studied architecture at the University of Chile. In this period he received three golden medals for his projects, which were exhibited at the Museo de Bellas Artes in Santiago, and in 1916, completed his first work, a house at 1854 Augustinas Avenue, Santiago.

== Architectural style ==
Kulczewski's architectural style stems from Gothic Revival architecture, Art Nouveau, and later in his career from the emerging Modern movement. After 1939, Social consciousness became an element of his work.

== Political activism ==
In 1931, Kulczewski and architect Arturo Bianchi Guandian formed the Orden Socialista (the Socialist Order). On 19 April 1933, the Socialist Order attended the Chilean Socialist Convention and merged with other parties to form the Partido Socialista.

Kulczewski works as the manager of the presidential campaign of Pedro Aguirre Cerda in 1938. In 1939 nominated by the president Cerda as the Administrator of the Workers' Security until 1940.

After his death, Kulczewski's ashes were spread in the Père-Lachaise cemetery, Paris and at San Cristóbal Hill in Santiago by his son and daughter.

== Works ==
Some of his best known projects are:

- Funicular railway station, Pio Nono 468, and the Roof Garden restaurant (now demolished) at the San Cristobal's Hill (Metropolitan Park) (1924).
- Casa de las Arañas (House of the Spiders), Metropolitan Park, Santiago. (1924 – 1927). Demolished except for the wrought iron window that gave the building its name.
- M. Figueroa's house, now the College of Architects building, 215 L. Bernardo O'Higgins Avenue, Santiago. (1922)
- Apartment building, 84 Catedral Avenue, Santiago. (1923)
- Apartment building La Gargola, 268 Merced Avenue, Santiago. (1928)
- Hotel Luciano K, 84 Merced Avenue, Santiago. (1928)
- Swimming pool building, 983 Santa Maria Avenue, Santiago. (1929)
- House Los Torreones, architect's residence & office, 201 Estados Unidos Avenue, Santiago. (1930)
- Subdivision Keller, Comuna de Providencia, Santiago. (1925).
- Subdivision Calle Madrid, Santiago. (1927).
- Subdivision Leopoldo Urrutía, Población Militar, Comuna de Ñuñoa, Santiago. (1929).
- Subdivision Los Castaños, Comuna Independencia, Santiago. (1930).
- Subdivision Virginia Opazo (former residence at the Quinta Meiggs), Santiago. (1940).
- Apartment buildings Los Colectivos in Arica, Iquique, Tocopilla, and Antofagasta, with architect Aquiles Zanelli (1940 – 1967).
