= Longher =

Longher is a surname. Notable people with the surname include:

- Aleksandru Longher (born 2000), Romanian footballer
- Ghervazen Longher (born 1972), Romanian politician
- Victoria Longher (born 1971), Romanian politician
