= Aleksandru Longher =

Romanian footballer

Personal information
- Full name: Aleksandru Robert Longher
- Date of birth: 8 June 2000 (age 26)
- Place of birth: Suceava, Romania
- Height: 1.77 m (5 ft 10 in)
- Position: Midfielder

Team information
- Current team: Cetatea Suceava
- Number: 70

Youth career
- –2013: Sporting Suceava
- 2013–2018: Dinamo București

Senior career*
Years	Team	Apps	(Gls)
2017–2020	Dinamo București	4	(0)
2019–2020	→ Botoșani (loan)	0	(0)
2020	Politehnica Iași	2	(0)
2020–2022	Academica Clinceni	25	(0)
2022–2023	Unirea Constanța	7	(0)
2023–2024	CS Dinamo București		
2024–2025	AFC Câmpulung Muscel	8	(0)
2026	Șoimii Gura Humorului		
2026–	Cetatea Suceava	0	(0)
- * Club domestic league appearances and goals as of 29 October 2026

Aleksandru Robert Longher (born 8 June 2000) is a Romanian professional footballer who plays as a midfielder for Liga II club Cetatea Suceava.

== Club career ==
=== Dinamo București ===
Longher made his debut in Liga I in November 2017, for Dinamo București.

=== Botoșani ===
On 6 August 2019, Longher signed a contract for three years with Botoșani.

=== Politehnica Iași ===
On 20 January 2020, Longher joined Liga I side Politehnica Iași.

== Personal life ==
Born in Romania, Longher is of Polish descent and his father Ghervazen Longher is the president of the Union of Poles of Romania.

== Honours ==
AFC Câmpulung Muscel

- Liga III: 2023–24
