= Poland–Romania relations =

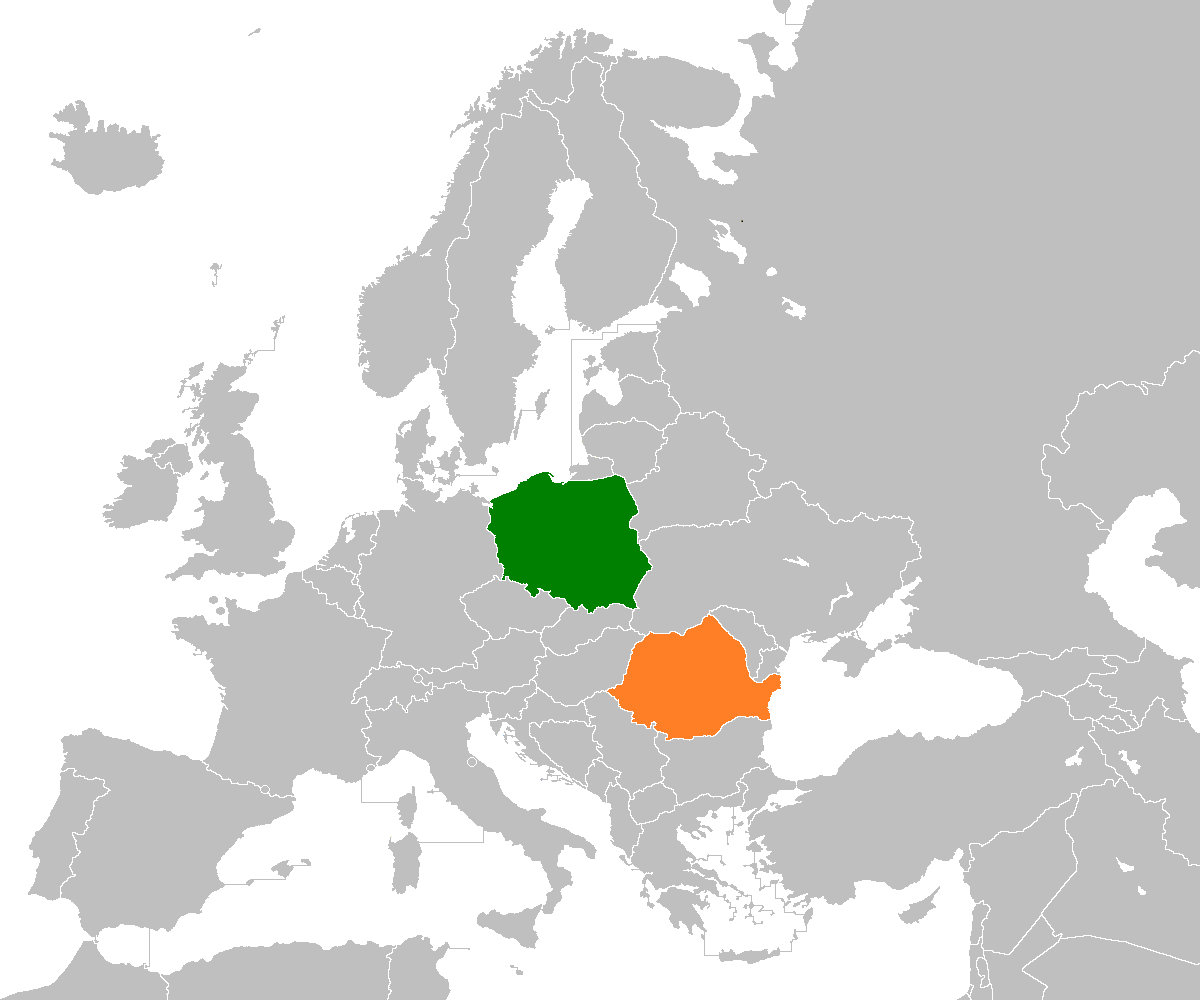
- Poland: Romania

Poland–Romania relations are foreign relations between Poland and Romania.

Both countries established diplomatic relations on 22 June 1919. In recent years government representatives of Poland and Romania regularly exchange high-level visits, a reflection of the mutual interest in bilateral cooperation between the two countries.

Both are full members of NATO and of the European Union and are the two most populous nations to join either bloc since the end of the Cold War. Both are also members of the Bucharest Nine, the Three Seas Initiative, the OSCE and the Council of Europe.

Poland has given full support to Romania's membership in the European Union and NATO.

== History ==
=== Beginnings ===
The beginnings of Polish influence in Romania can be traced back to the 14th century with the founding of the Principality of Moldavia. Trade between the Baltic and Black Seas between the two neighboring countries facilitated their growing bond. During this era Moldavia was a vassal state of first the Kingdom of Poland and later the Polish–Lithuanian Commonwealth several times.

Samuel Teofil Glück, Polish physician and envoy of the Polish émigré activists at Hôtel Lambert and insurgent authorities during the January Uprising of 1863–1864 to Romania, became the head of the civilian health service in Romania in 1864, and the court doctor of Carol I of Romania in 1866. He also initiated the introduction of the Gregorian calendar in Romania.

During World War I, on 18–23 January 1915, the Battle of Cârlibaba was fought in present-day northern Romania between the Polish Legions and Russian troops, won by the Poles. There is a memorial at the site. Poles from the Russian Partition of Poland conscripted to the Russian Army and Romanians were among Allied prisoners of war held by the Germans in a POW camp in Stargard in modern northwestern Poland. During the war, Lucjan Skupiewski, Polish physician born in Warsaw, was the organizer and manager of all hospitals for the wounded in the Bucharest area. After the war, he stayed in Romania, and was the deputy deputy mayor of Bucharest and senator for the Polish minority.

Following the restoration of independent Poland, since 1919, many Poles left Bukovina for Poland. In early 1919, Poland began to clash with the West Ukrainian People's Republic Army on the territory of Galicia and Pokuttia. As a result of these clashes, the Polish government asked Romania for military support in Pokuttia. After the request was accepted, the Romanian 8th Infantry Division led by General Iacob Zadik was sent to the region on 22 May 1919. The mission in Pokuttia lasted until 24 August 1919.

=== Polish–Romanian alliance ===
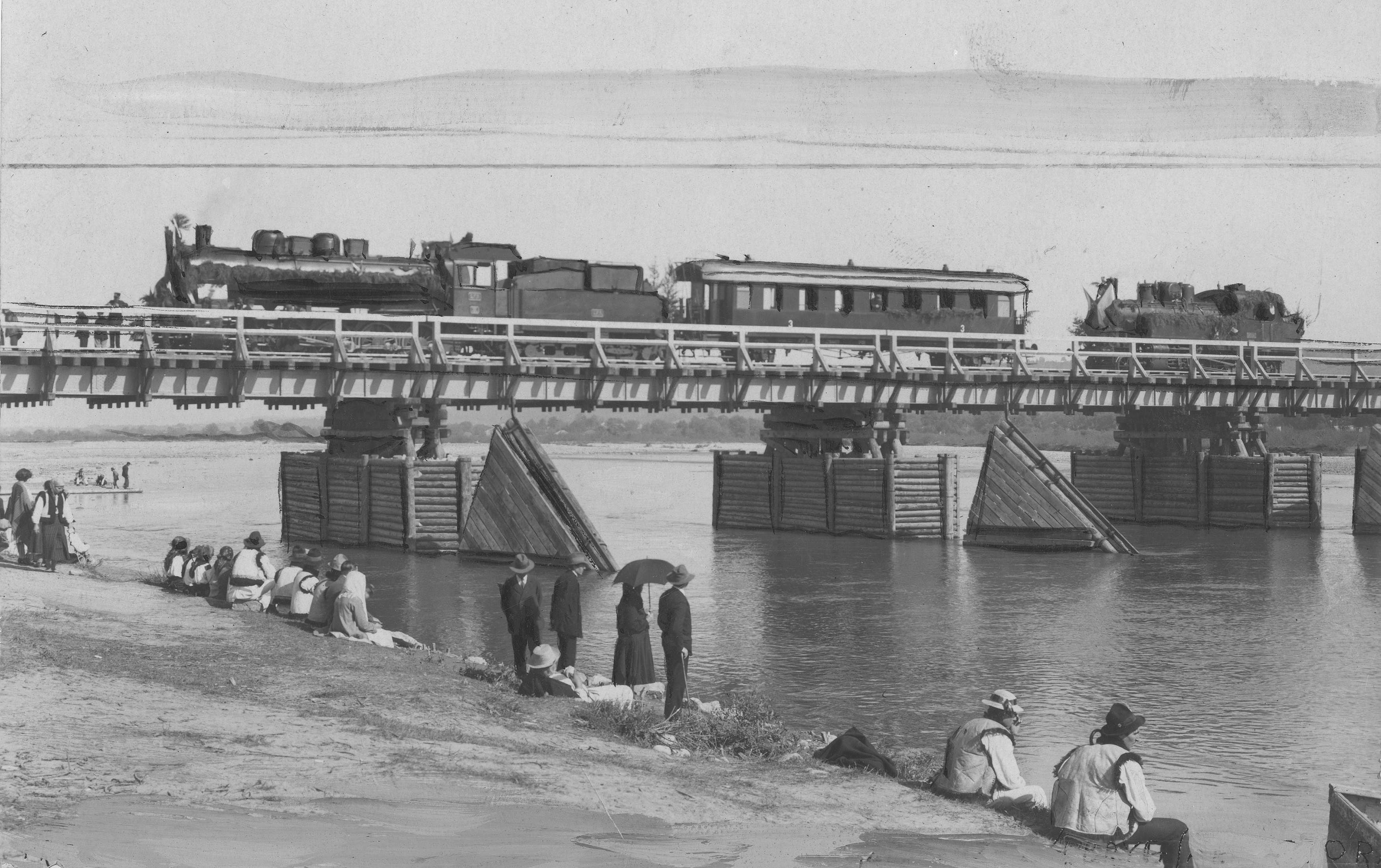
Bridge at the former Polish–Romanian border in Kuty seen from the Polish side of the border in 1930

Beginning in 1921, a series of treaties were signed in the interwar period by the Second Polish Republic and the Kingdom of Romania which created the Polish–Romanian alliance. The treaties formed a basis for good foreign relations between the two countries that lasted until World War II began in 1939. Both countries shared a common border in the interbellum, before the Soviet Union invaded and eventually annexed eastern Poland and northeastern Romania following the German-Soviet Molotov–Ribbentrop Pact.

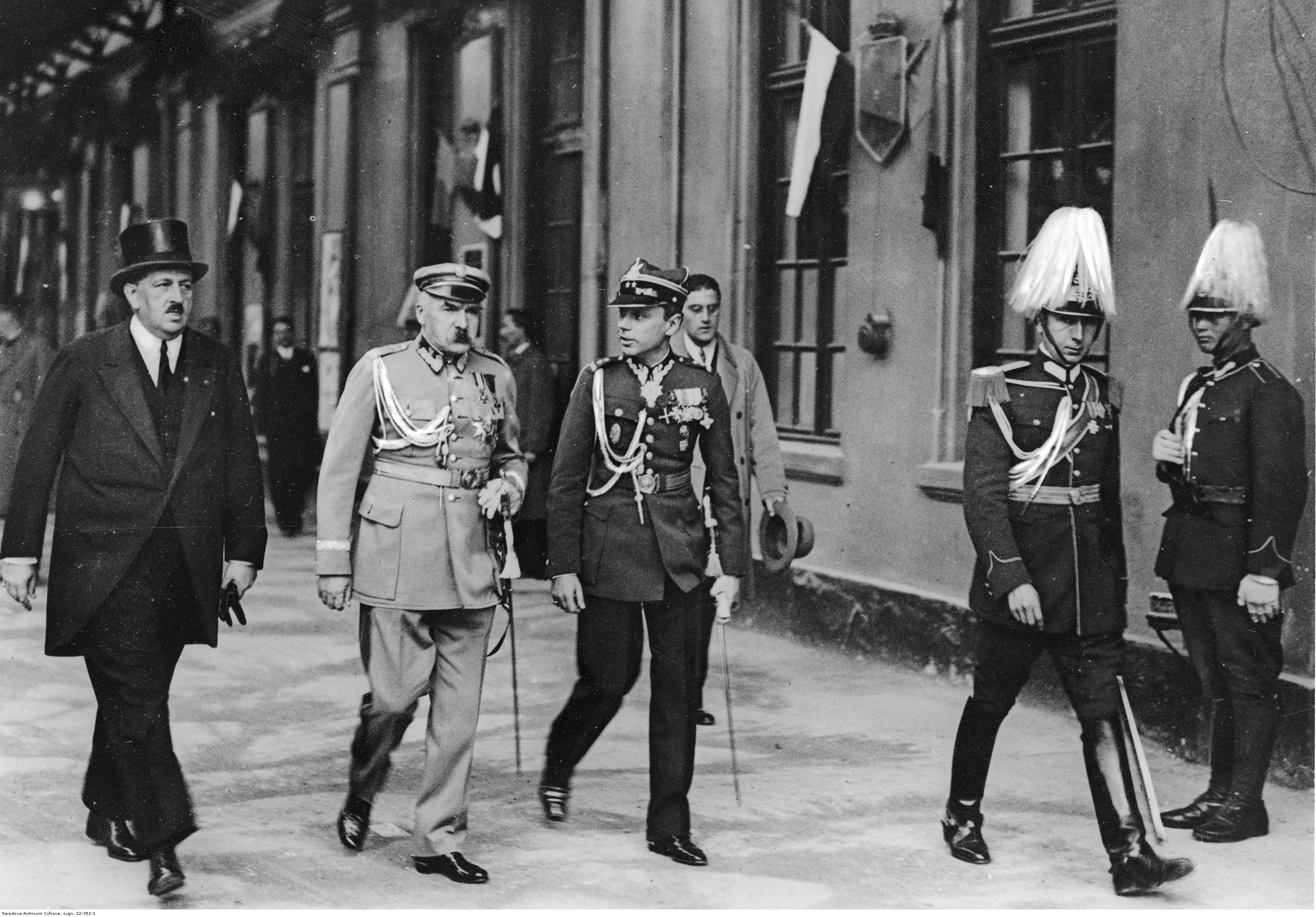
Visit of Marshal Józef Piłsudski in Romania in 1931

=== Romanian Bridgehead ===
After the invasion of Poland which started the Second World War, up to 120,000 Polish troops withdrew through the Romanian Bridgehead area to neutral Romania and Hungary. The majority of those troops joined the newly formed Polish Armed Forces in the West in France and the United Kingdom in 1939 and 1940. Because of their escape through Romania, the Polish army was one of the largest forces of the Allies prior to the United States entering the war and Germany's attack on the Soviet Union (Operation Barbarossa). Also 25,000 civilian refugees fled from Poland to Romania.

In mid-September 1939, despite German and Soviet pressure and Romania's declared neutrality, the Romanians agreed to transport evacuated Polish gold through Romanian territory to the port of Constanța, from where it was further evacuated via Turkey to Polish-allied France. When the German ambassador to Romania, Wilhelm Fabricius, protested Romania's violation of neutrality, Romanian Foreign Minister Grigore Gafencu pretended to know nothing about the transport of Polish gold, only promising to "carry out a proper investigation." The evacuation was successful. Romania's stance infuriated the Germans, and Fabricius threatened Minister Gafencu that Romania had "committed a grave breach of neutrality, which should never happen again."

During the war, ten Polish elementary schools and seven high schools were established for Polish refugee children in Romania, including in Călimănești, Ploiești and Târgoviște. Some young Poles then left Romania for France in 1940 to join the Polish Army in France and continue the fight against Germany. In the second half of 1940, because of the German danger, some Polish refugees were evacuated from Romania to Cyprus.

In 1940, the Soviets deported some 30,000 people from Soviet-occupied eastern Poland to Soviet-occupied eastern Romania.

In 1942, Polish Prime Minister-in-Exile Władysław Sikorski's intervention to British and American authorities thwarted Soviet attempts to obtain Allied approval for the planned annexation of eastern Poland and Romania.

From 1944, Romanian prisoners of war were held by the Germans, alongside Polish and other Allied POWs, in the Oflag 73, Stalag VIII-B and Stalag VIII-C POW camps, located in Beniaminów, Łambinowice and Żagań, respectively.

After the war, many Poles from the sizeable Polish communities in Bukovina and Lupeni were repatriated to Poland.

== Modern relations ==
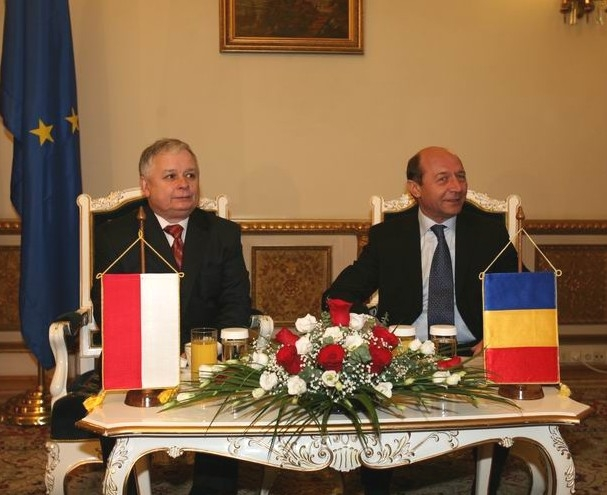
President of Romania Traian Băsescu and President of Poland Lech Kaczyński in Romania in 2007

Since 2017, a Polish military contingent has been stationed in Romania and a Romanian military contingent has been stationed in Poland as part of the NATO Tailored Forward Presence and Enhanced Forward Presence defense forces, respectively. The Polish soldiers equipped with Rosomak armoured personnel carriers are deployed as part of Multinational Brigade South-East. Likewise, Romania has a contingent of up to 120 soldiers deployed on rotation in Poland. The soldiers, equipped with Flakpanzer Gepard self-propelled anti-aircraft guns and one radar station, are deployed as part of Multinational Battalion Battle Group Poland.

Following a decision of the Polish state authorities in 2017, the 1st Logistics Battalion of the Polish 17th Mechanized Brigade received the heritage of the 57th Infantry Regiment "King Carol II of Romania", a unit which came under the honorary leadership of King Carol II of Romania in 1937. On 14 February 2020, the Romanian 634th Infantry Battalion also received the honorific name of "Marshal Józef Piłsudski" while taking over the heritage of the 16th Dorobanți Regiment "Józef Piłsudski" which received its name following a state visit by Marshal Piłsudski in 1932.

In October 2021, Poland sent medical equipment and medics to help fight the COVID-19 pandemic in Romania.

In 2023, the Romanian-Polish Solidarity Day was established to celebrate the cooperation and partnership between the two countries. The day of 3 March was chosen as it marks the date when the Romanian-Polish Defensive Alliance Convention was signed – 3 March 1921.

== Commercial ties ==
Trade between Romania and Poland in 2016 reached a record value of €4.86 billion according to statistics issued by the Polish Ministry of Economic Development.

The 2020 Women Leadership Forum (WLF) was held in Warsaw on March 4–5 with the goal of strengthening bilateral cooperation between Poland and Romania, emphasizing the role of women in politics, economy, and education. Organized by the Embassy of Romania in Poland, the Polish–Romanian Bilateral Chamber of Commerce and Industry and the Romanian Institute of Culture, the event was held under the honorary patronage of Her Royal Highness Margaret, the Guardian of the Crown of Romania, who at the invitation of the Romanian Embassy came to Warsaw for the event with her husband - His Royal Highness Radu, Prince of Romania.

== Polish diaspora in Romania ==
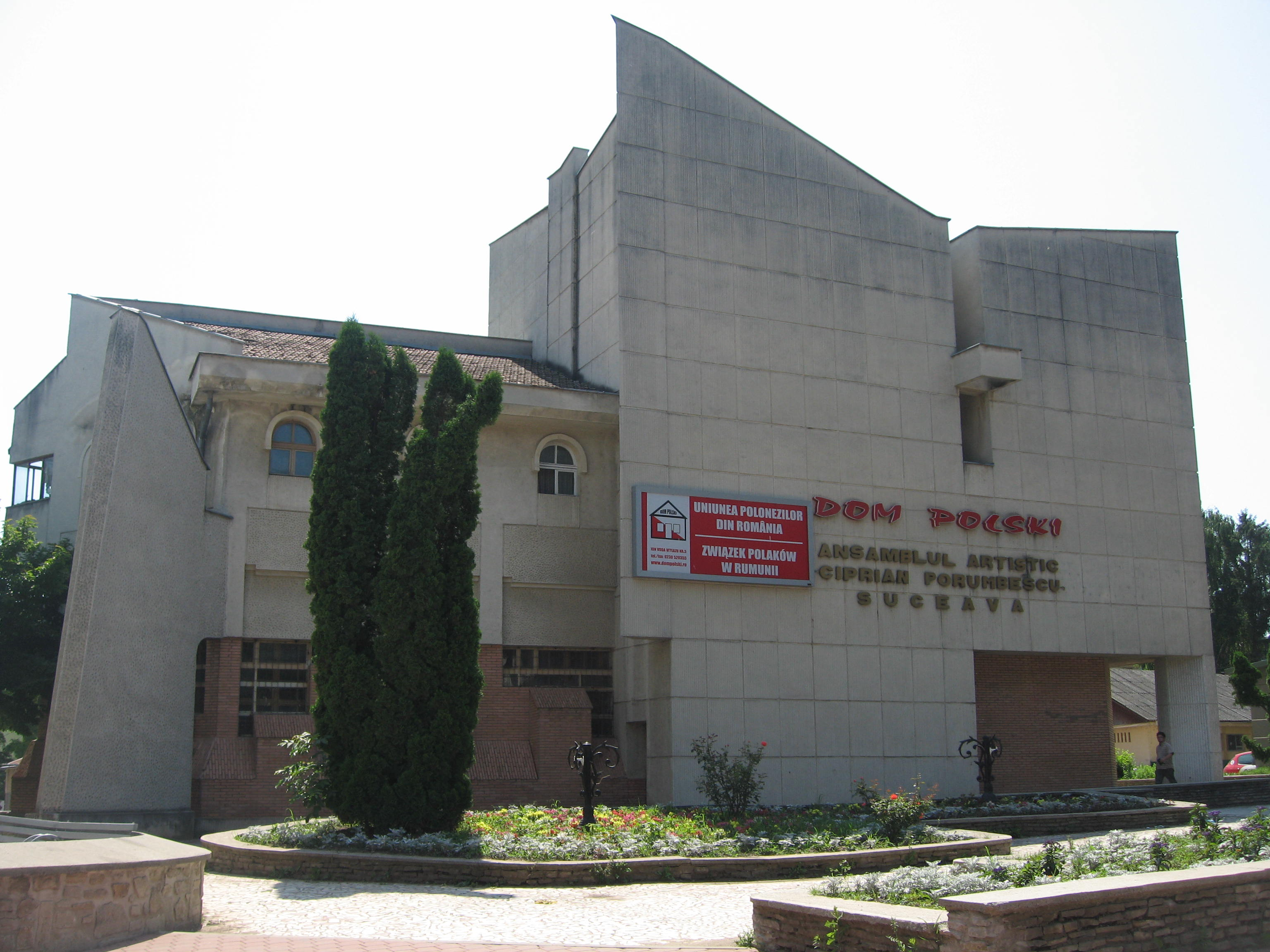
Headquarters of the Union of Poles of Romania in Suceava

Poles in Romania form an officially recognised national minority, having one seat in the Chamber of Deputies of Romania, currently held by the Union of Poles of Romania (Polish: Związek Polaków w Rumunii "Dom Polski", Romanian: Uniunea Polonezilor din România). Poles in Romania have access to Polish elementary schools and cultural centers which are referred to as "Polish Homes".

== The European Union and NATO ==
Poland joined the EU in 2004. Romania joined the EU in 2007. Poland joined NATO in 1999. Romania joined NATO in 2004.

== Resident diplomatic missions ==
- Poland has an embassy in Bucharest.
- Romania has an embassy in Warsaw.
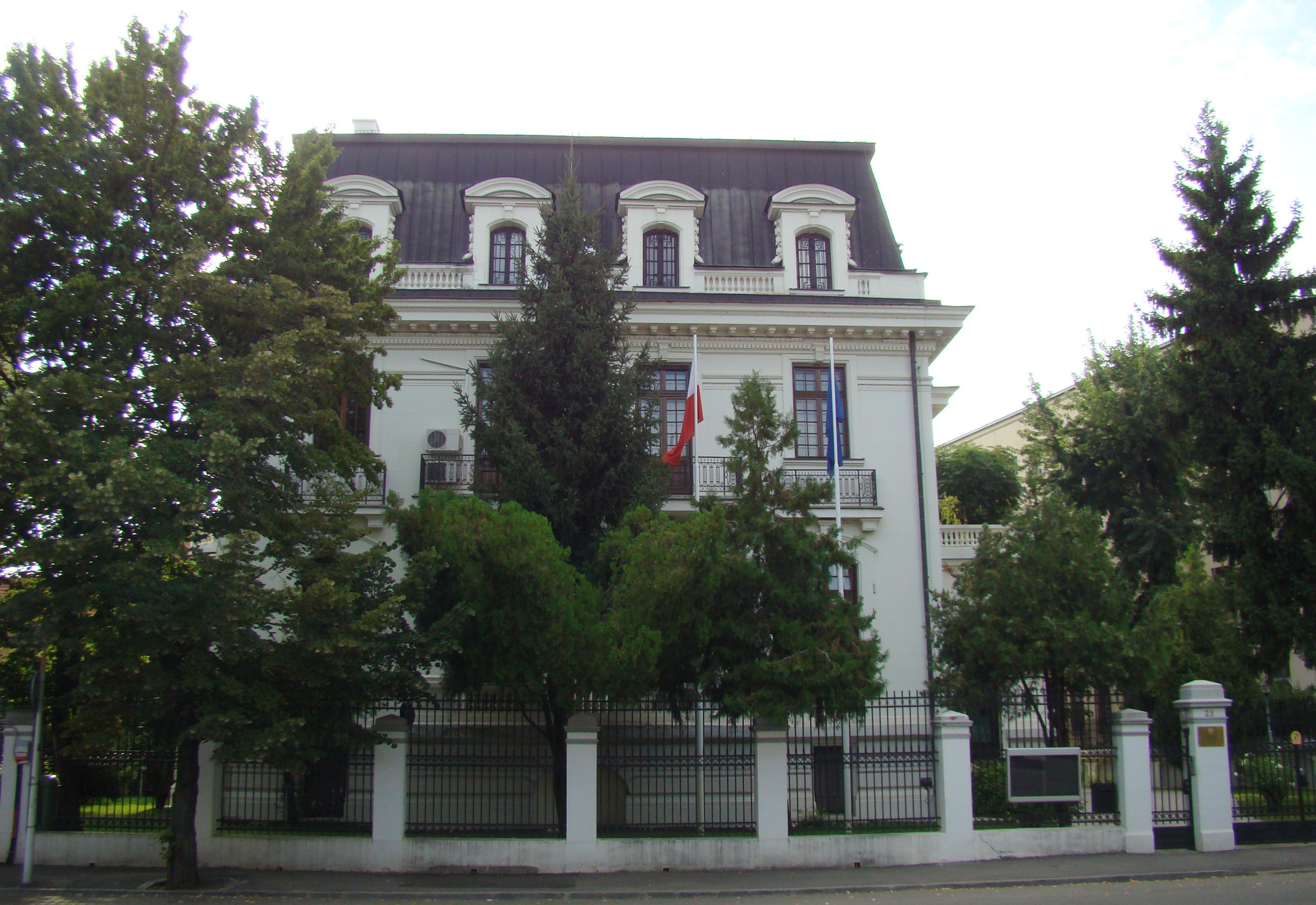
Embassy of Poland in Bucharest

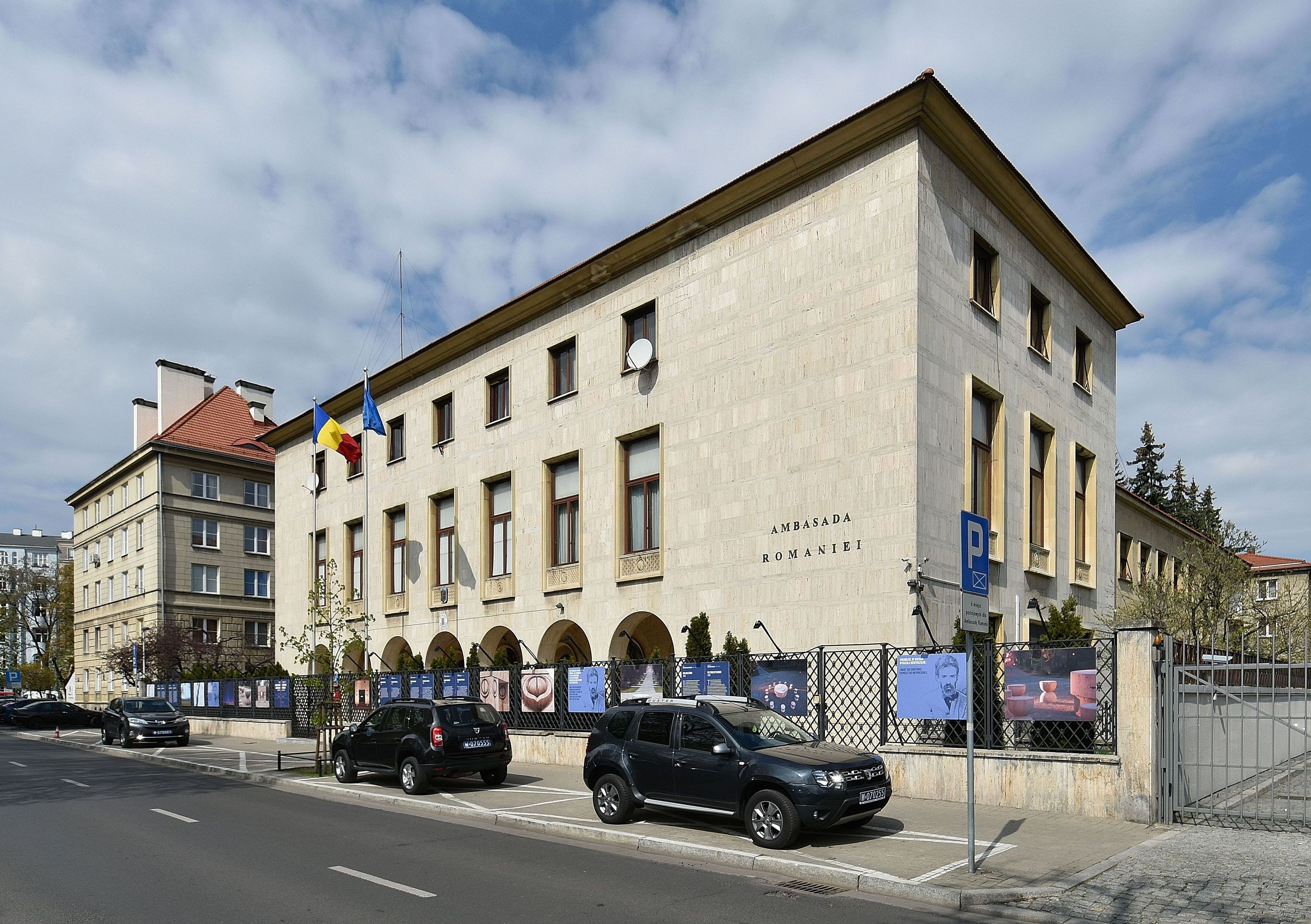
Embassy of Romania in Warsaw

== See also ==
- Foreign relations of Poland
- Foreign relations of Romania
