= Victoria Longher =

Romanian politician (born 1971)

Member of the Chamber of Deputies
- In office 21 December 2016 – 21 December 2020
- Preceded by: Ghervazen Longher
- Succeeded by: Ghervazen Longher

Personal details
- Born: 15 November 1971 (age 54) Cacica, Suceava County, Romania
- Party: Union of Poles of Romania
- Spouse: Ghervazen Longher

Victoria Longher (born 15 November 1971) is a Romanian politician. Representing the Polish minority from Suceava County, she was a member of the Chamber of Deputies in the 2016-2020 legislature.

== Biography ==
Longher is the wife of Ghervazen Longher, a deputy from the Union of Poles from 2002 to 2016, and he was sentenced by the High Court of Cassation and Justice to a three-month suspended prison term for the crime of conflict of interest. In the 2016 elections, Longher was elected to the Chamber of Deputies on as the party's representative. Her husband Ghervazen successfully ran for the Chamber of Deputies again in 2020, losing her seat in the process.
