= Poles in Romania =

Romanian citizens of Polish descent

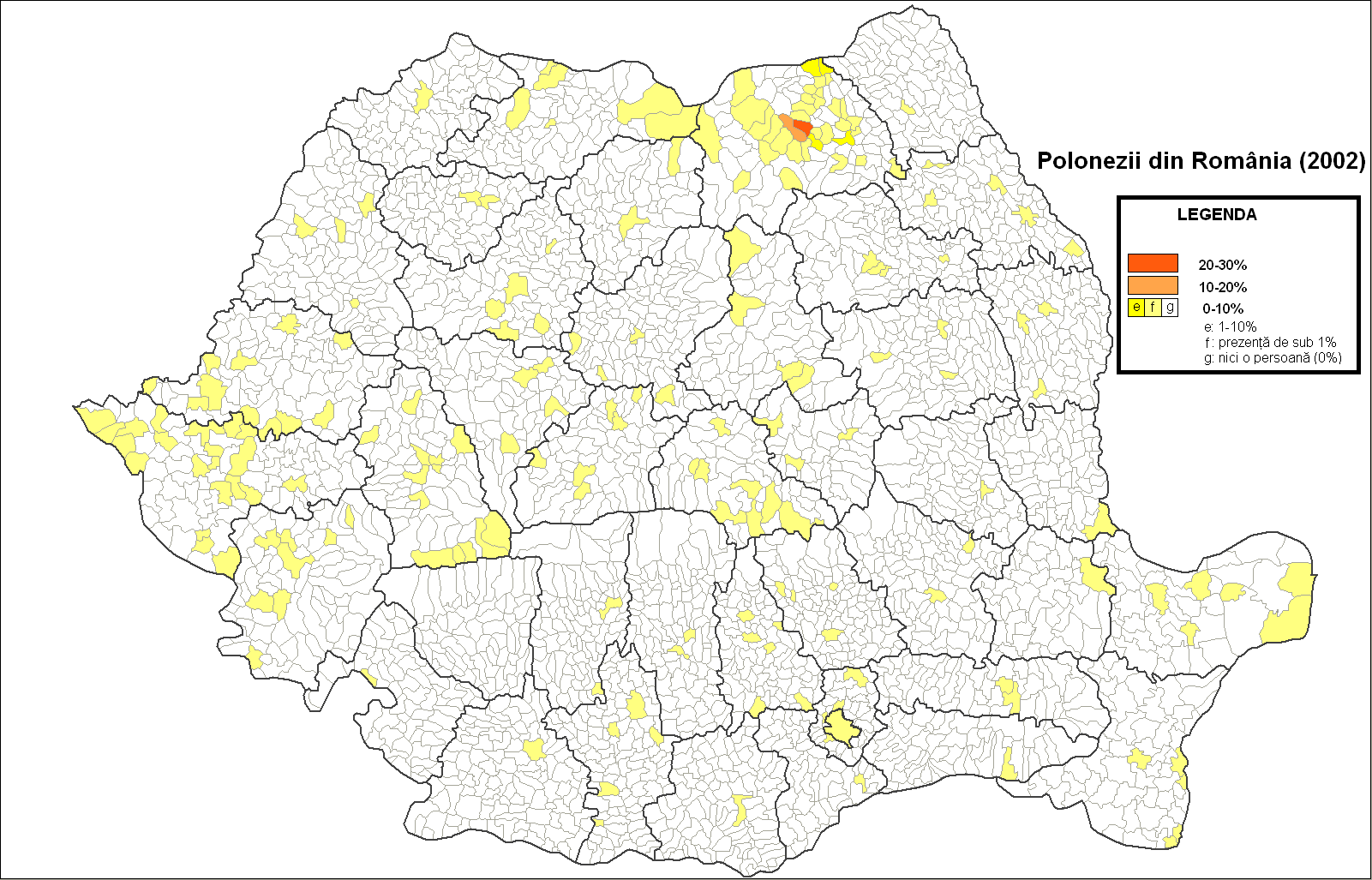
- Poles in Romania (2002 census)

Total population
- 2,137 (2021)

Regions with significant populations
- Suceava County

Languages
- Polish · Romanian

Religion
- Mainly Roman Catholicism, but also Greek Catholic and Orthodox

Related ethnic groups
- Polish diaspora

According to the 2021 Romanian census, 2,137 Poles live in Romania, mainly in the villages of Suceava County (Polish: Suczawa). There are three exclusively Polish villages, as follows: Nowy Sołoniec (Solonețu Nou), Plesza (Pleșa), and Pojana Mikuli (Poiana Micului), as well a significant Polish presence in Kaczyca (Cacica) and Paltynosa (Păltinoasa). There is also a relatively sizable number of ethnic Poles living in the county seat, Suceava (Polish: Suczawa).

Poles in Romania form an officially recognised national minority, having one seat in the Chamber of Deputies (currently held by the Union of Poles of Romania) and access to Polish elementary schools and cultural centres (known as "Polish Houses" or "Dom Polski" in Polish).

== History ==
Historical population
Year	Pop.	±%
1930	48,310	—
1948	6,753	−86.0%
1956	7,627	+12.9%
1966	5,860	−23.2%
1977	4,641	−20.8%
1992	4,232	−8.8%
2002	3,559	−15.9%
2011	2,543	−28.5%
2022	2,137	−16.0%
Official census data

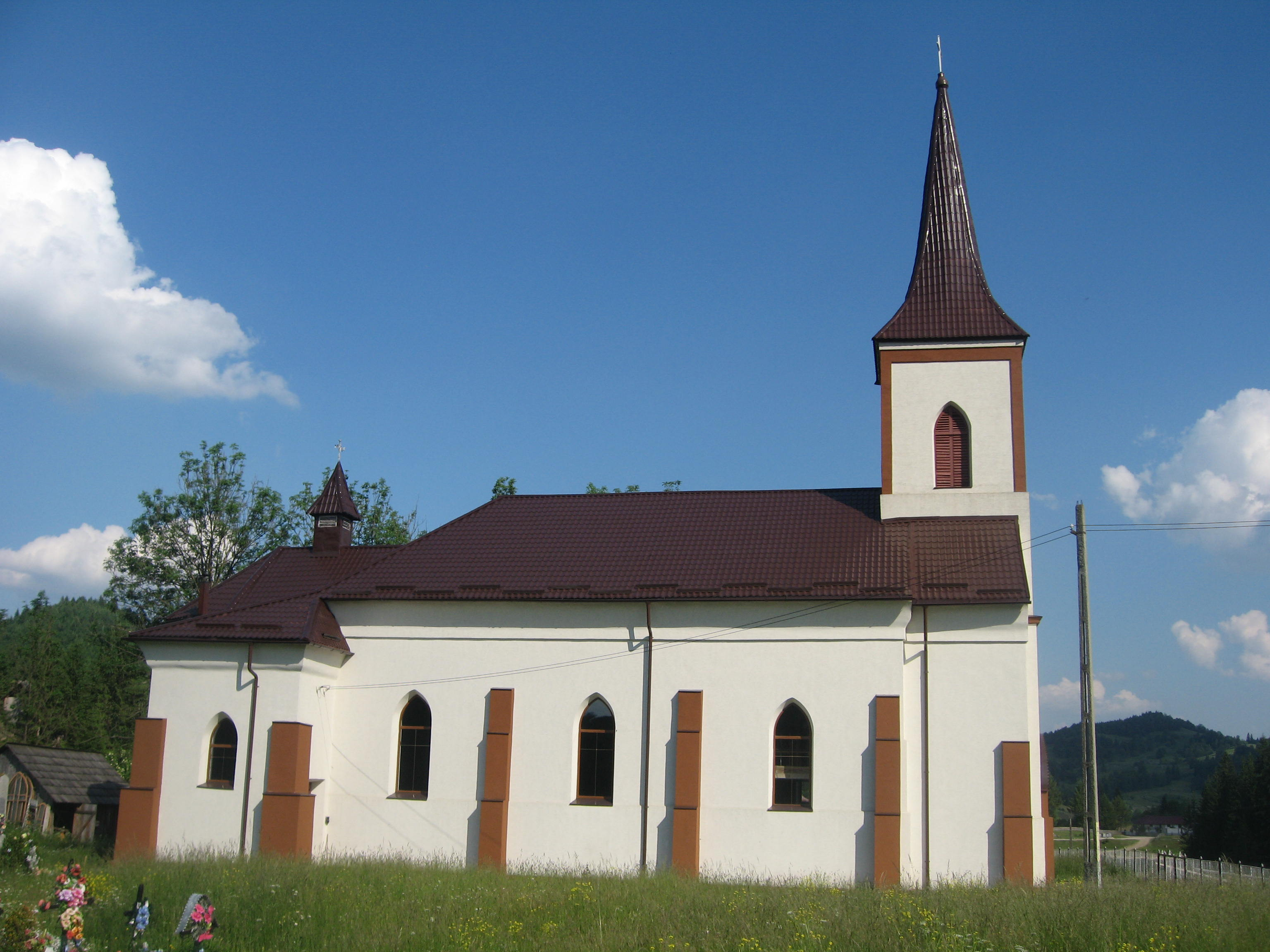
Roman Catholic church in Poiana Micului (Polish: Pojana Mikuli)

The first Poles settled in Moldavia in the times of Casimir III (specifically during the Late Middle Ages). Most of the Poles immigrating after 1774 were looking for work. So it was that Polish miners from Bochnia and Wieliczka were brought to salt mines in Cacica.

Another wave of Polish immigration arrived in Bukovina in the early 19th century, when the region was a crownland of the Austro-Hungarian Empire, as was a significant portion of present-day southern Poland (see: Kingdom of Galicia and Lodomeria).

Around 1803, Polish highlanders from Čadca (Polish: Czaca, Czadca) settled in Treblecz (Tereblecea, now in Chernivtsi Raion, Chernivtsi Oblast, Ukraine) by Siret, in Stara Huta Krasna and in Kaliczanka and again in 1814 to 1819, this time settling in Hliboka (Adâncata) and Tereszna. Nowy Sołoniec was settled in 1834, Plesza in 1835, and Pojana Mikuli in 1842.

At that time, it must be mentioned that Bukovina was a very attractive region of the Austrian Empire to live in thanks to Austria's policy not to conscript recruits into its army from there (service in the Austrian army at that time was for a 14-year term).

Furthermore, Bukovina was free from serfdom, primarily attracting immigrants of German (who later formed the basis of the Bukovina German community of the region), Jewish, and also Czecho-Slovak origin but also Polish ethnicity and even Russian and Italian.

There were probably other waves of migration from Poland after the November and Kraków Uprisings, but most Poles were from peasant families relocated there by the Empire's authorities after they participated in the Jakub Szela insurrection.

During World War I, Lucjan Skupiewski, Polish physician born in Warsaw, was the organizer and manager of all hospitals for the wounded in the Bucharest area. After the war, he stayed in Romania, and was the deputy deputy mayor of Bucharest and senator for the Polish minority.

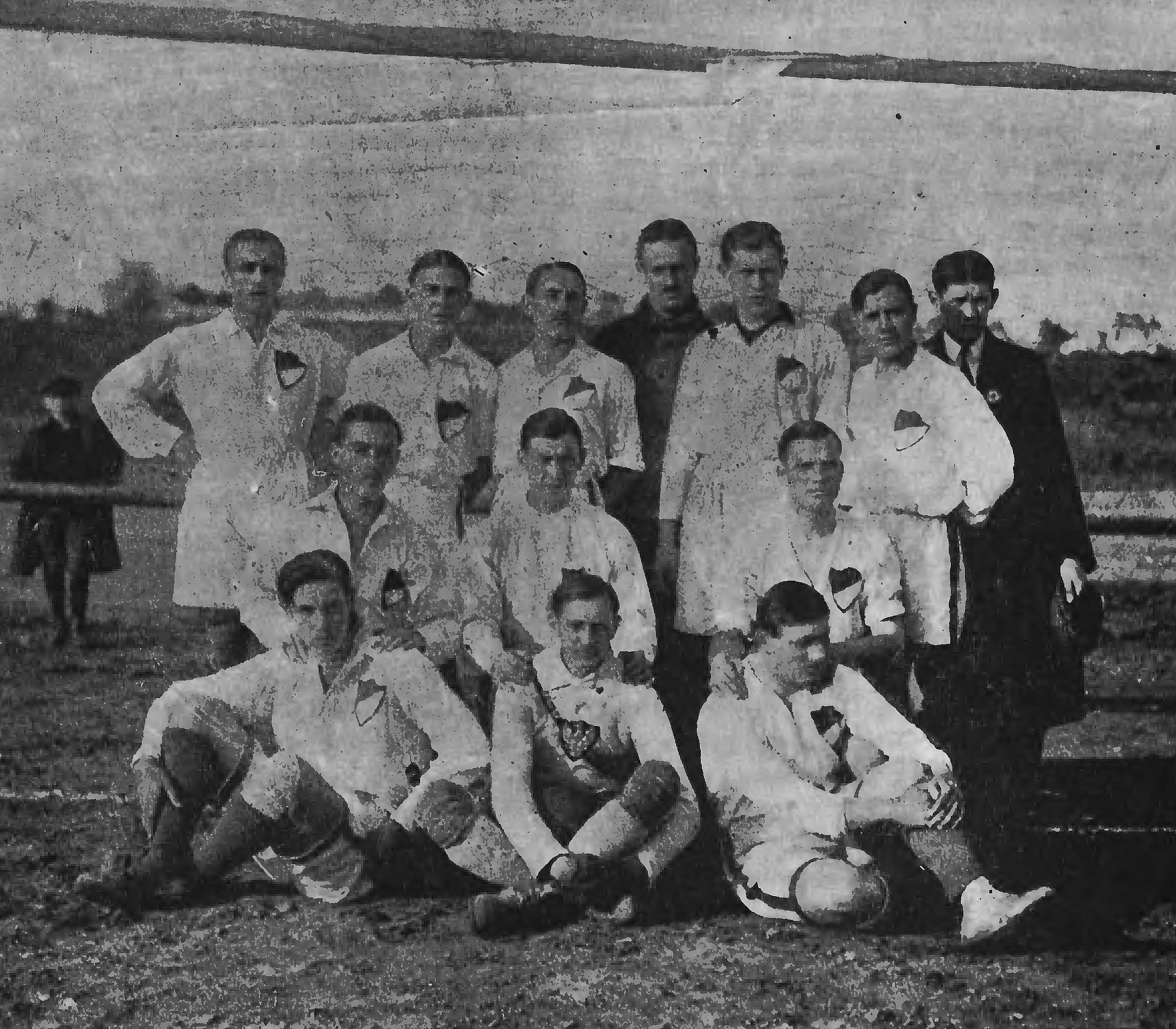
Polonia Cernăuți football team in 1920

Following the restoration of independent Poland, since 1919, many Poles left Bukovina for Poland. Four Polish newspapers were issued in Romania in the interbellum (Gazeta Polska, Głos Ludu, Głos Prawdy, Kurier Polski w Rumunii). The largest urban concentrations of Poles in Romania were Cernăuți (with 8,986 people), Bucharest (1,650), Chișinău (1,436), Sadagura (1,333), Storojineț (1,017) and Bălți (981), according to the 1930 Romanian census. The Polonia Cernăuți Polish football club was active in Cernăuți, and was one of the top teams in the region of Bukovina, winning several regional championships and reaching the quarterfinals of the national Romanian championships three times.

During World War II, a portion of northern and eastern Romania was annexed by the Soviet Union, including the Cernăuți, Storojineț and Bălți counties, which were home to sizeable Polish populations of 15,243, 7,985 and 3,165 people, respectively, according to the 1930 Romanian census. After the war, many Poles from the sizeable Polish communities in Bukovina and Lupeni were repatriated to Poland.

== Communes with the highest Polish population percentage ==
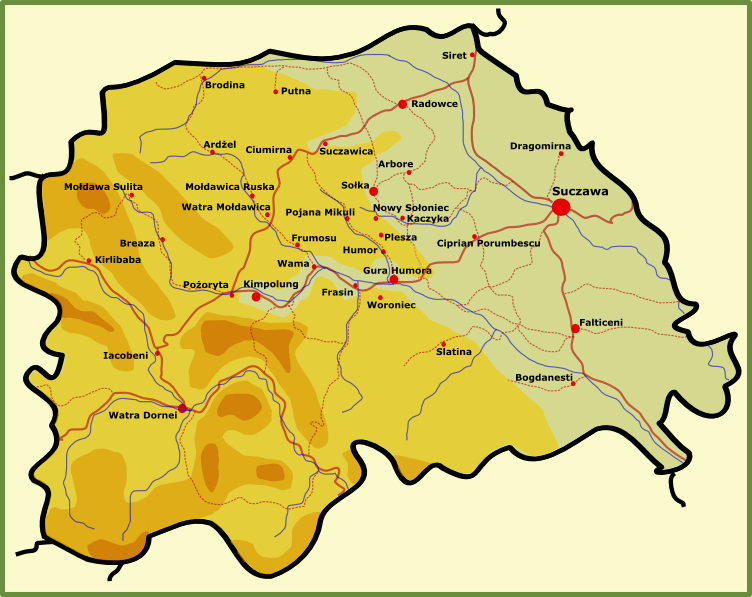
Map of Suceava County, southern Bukovina (in Polish)

- Suceava County
  - Cacica — 20.04%
  - Mănăstirea Humorului — 19.3%
  - Mușenița — 4.06%
  - Moara — 3.23%
  - Păltinoasa — 1.14%

== Notable Polish Romanians ==
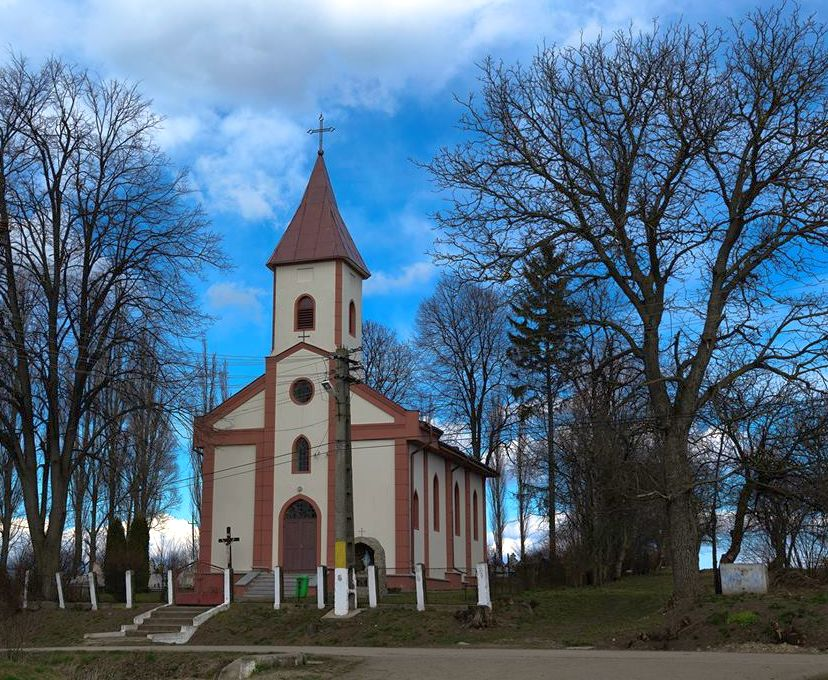
Roman Catholic church in Vicșani (Polish: Wikszany)

- Michał Belina Czechowski, Seventh-Day Adventist preacher
- Romuald Bulfinsky (partly Polish), actor and manager
- Henri Cihoski, lieutenant-general
- Corneliu Zelea Codreanu, politician, founder of the Iron Guard
- Tytus Czerkawski, politician
- Marian Kielec, footballer
- Izydor Kopernicki, physician
- Ghervazen Longher, politician
- Iosif Malinovski, Roman Catholic vicar and publisher
- Mărgărita Miller-Verghy, author, journalist, critic, and translator
- Leonard Mociulschi, major general
- Stefan Norris (born in Poland; subsequently settled in Romania), art director
- Gustaw Otręba, physician
- Ioan Gyuri Pascu (partly Polish), musician, actor, and comedian
- Ciprian Porumbescu, composer
- Witold Rola Piekarski, cartoonist and academic
- Robert Sadowski, international footballer
- Octavian Smigelschi (partly Polish), painter
- Mihail Sorbul (partly Polish), playwright and novelist
- Wojciech Weiss, painter
- Feliks Wierciński, Roman Catholic priest and schoolteacher
- Adolf Zytogorski (born in Romania; moved to Poland then England), chess master and translator

== Gallery ==
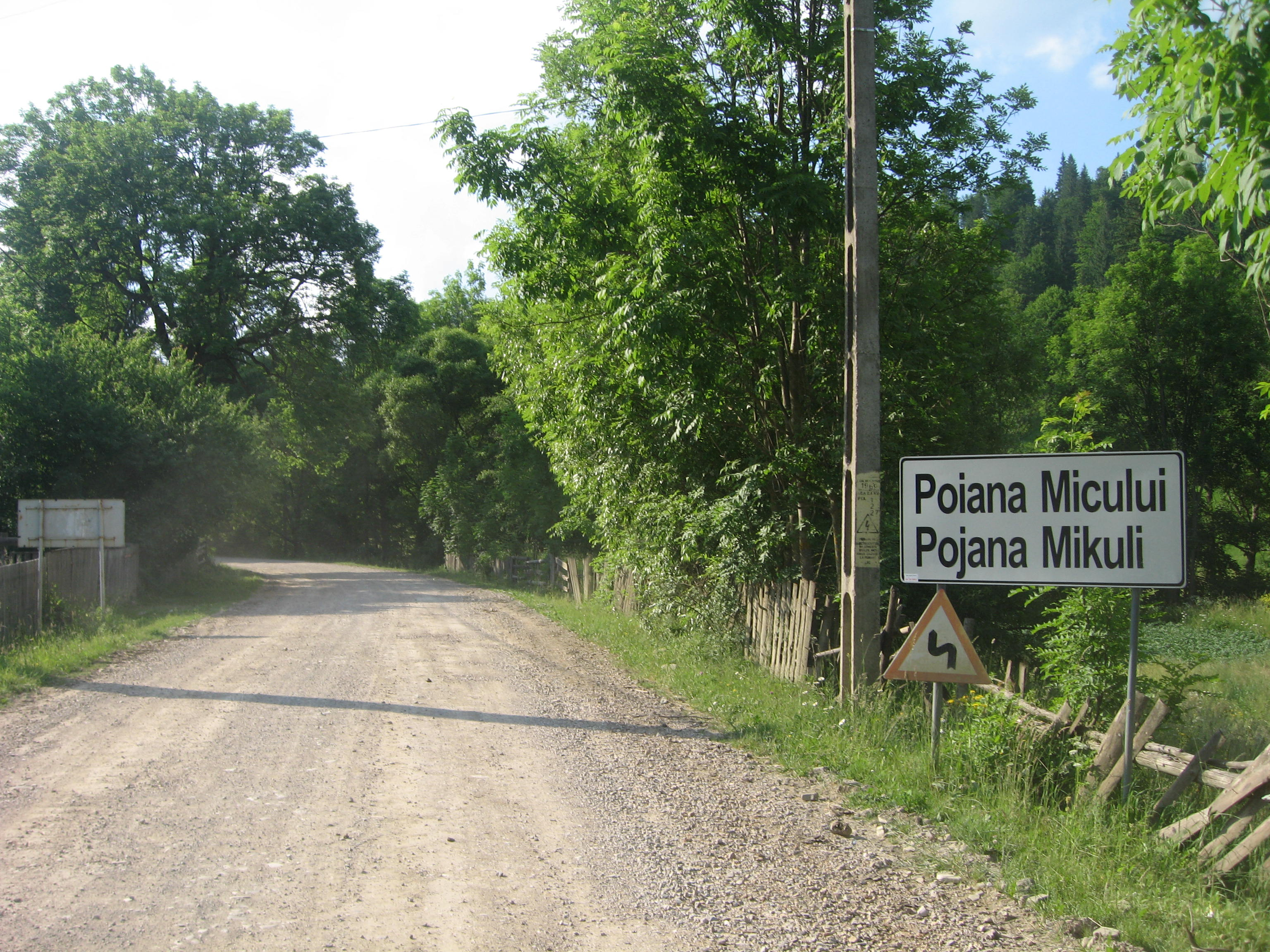
Polish-Romanian bilingual sign at the entrance in the village of Poiana Micului (Polish: Pojana Mikuli)

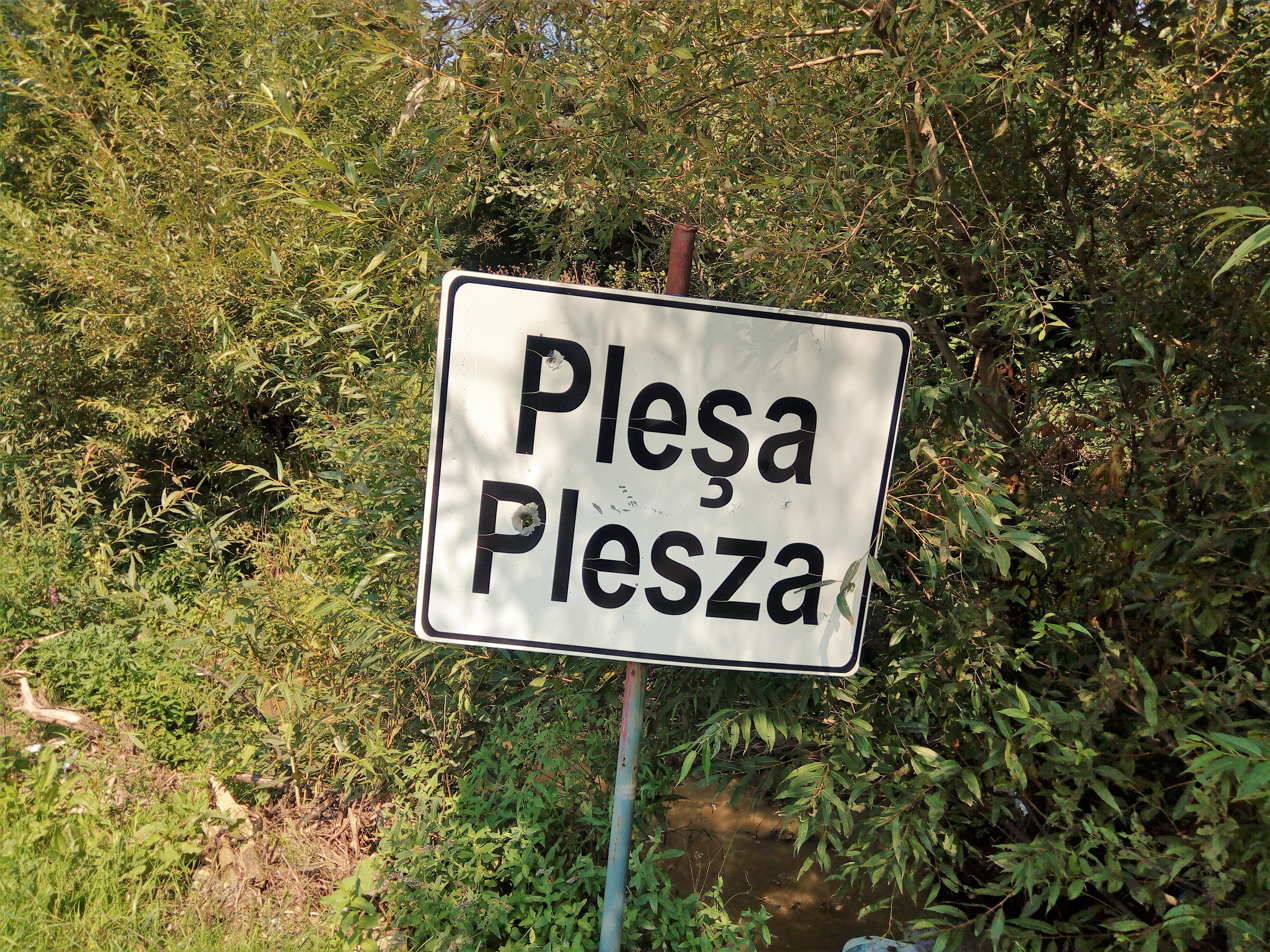
Romanian-Polish bilingual sign at the entrance in the village of Pleșa (Plesza)

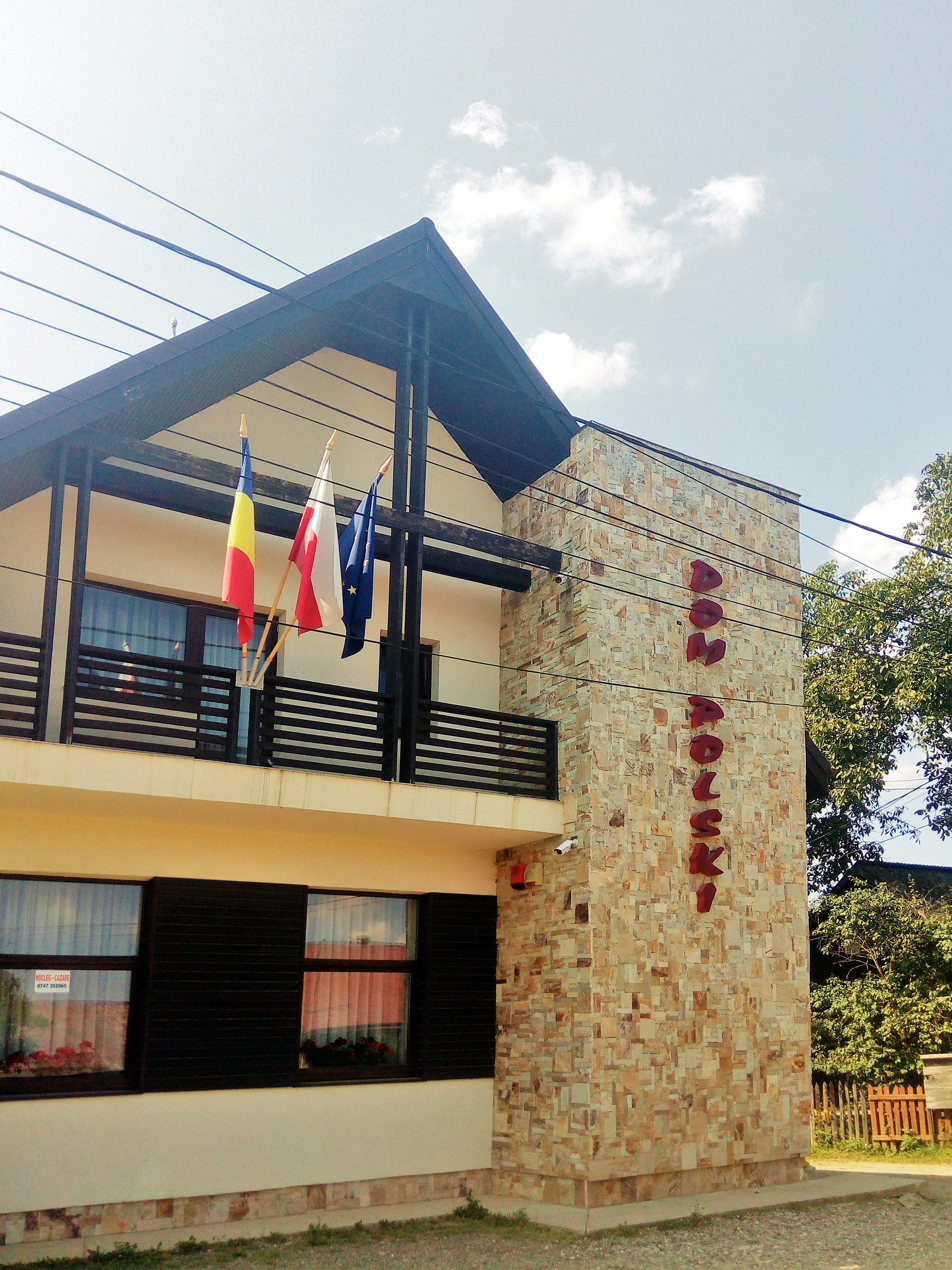
The Polish House (Dom Polski) in Pleșa (Plesza)

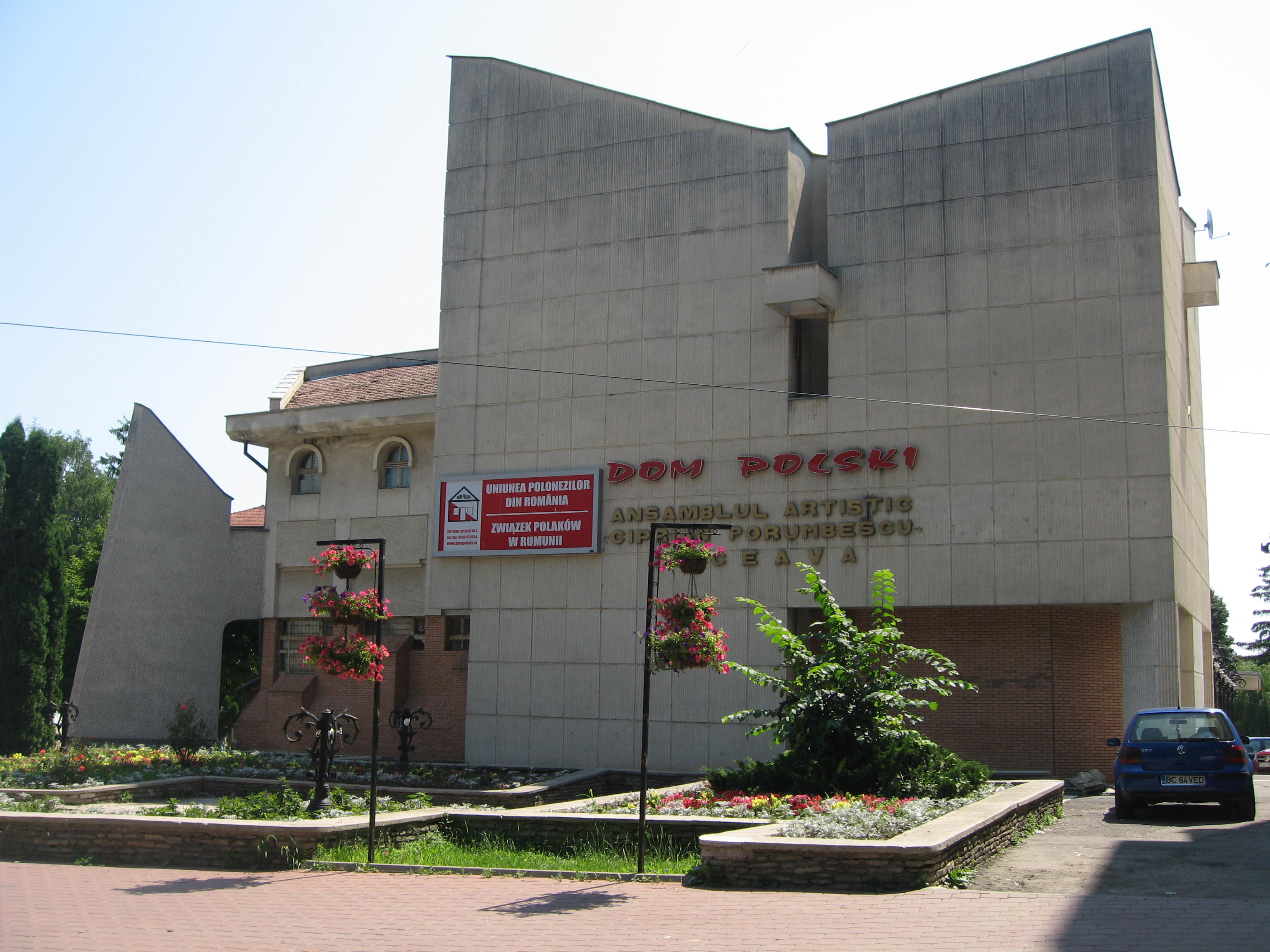
The Polish House in Suceava (Dom Polski w Suczawie), built at the round of the 20th century (more specifically between 1903 and 1907)

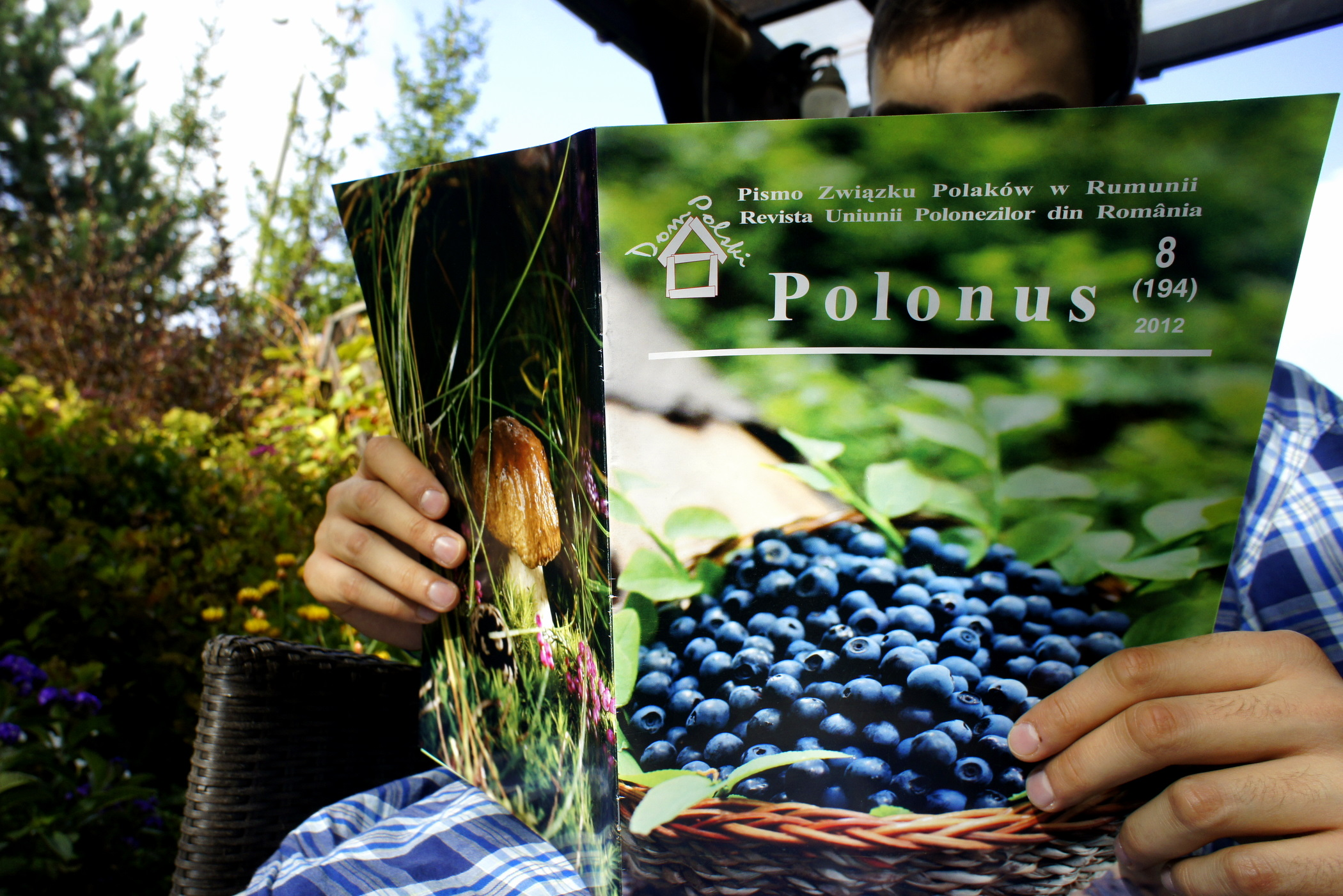
Polish newspaper in Romania

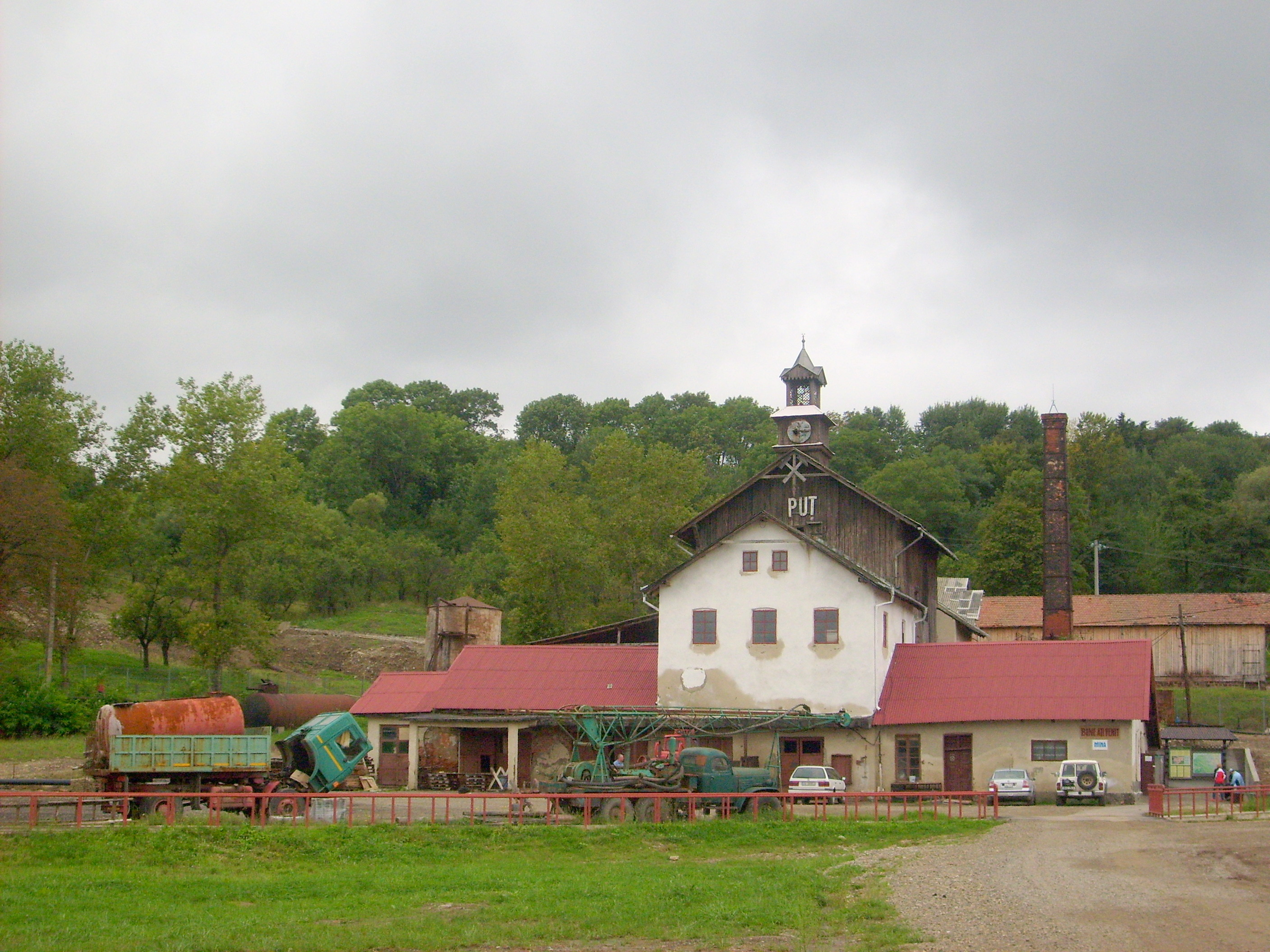
The salt mine in Cacica (Polish: Kaczyka), Suceava county, southern Bukovina

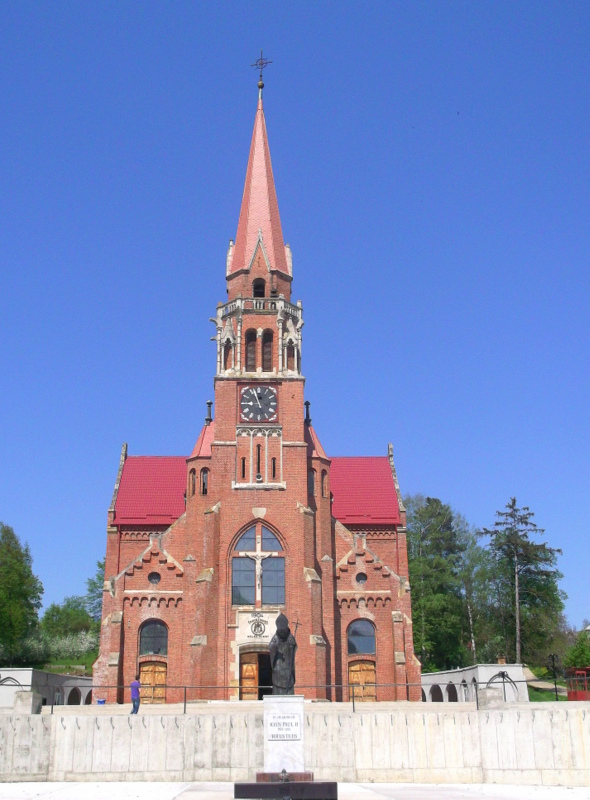
Roman Catholic basilica in Cacica

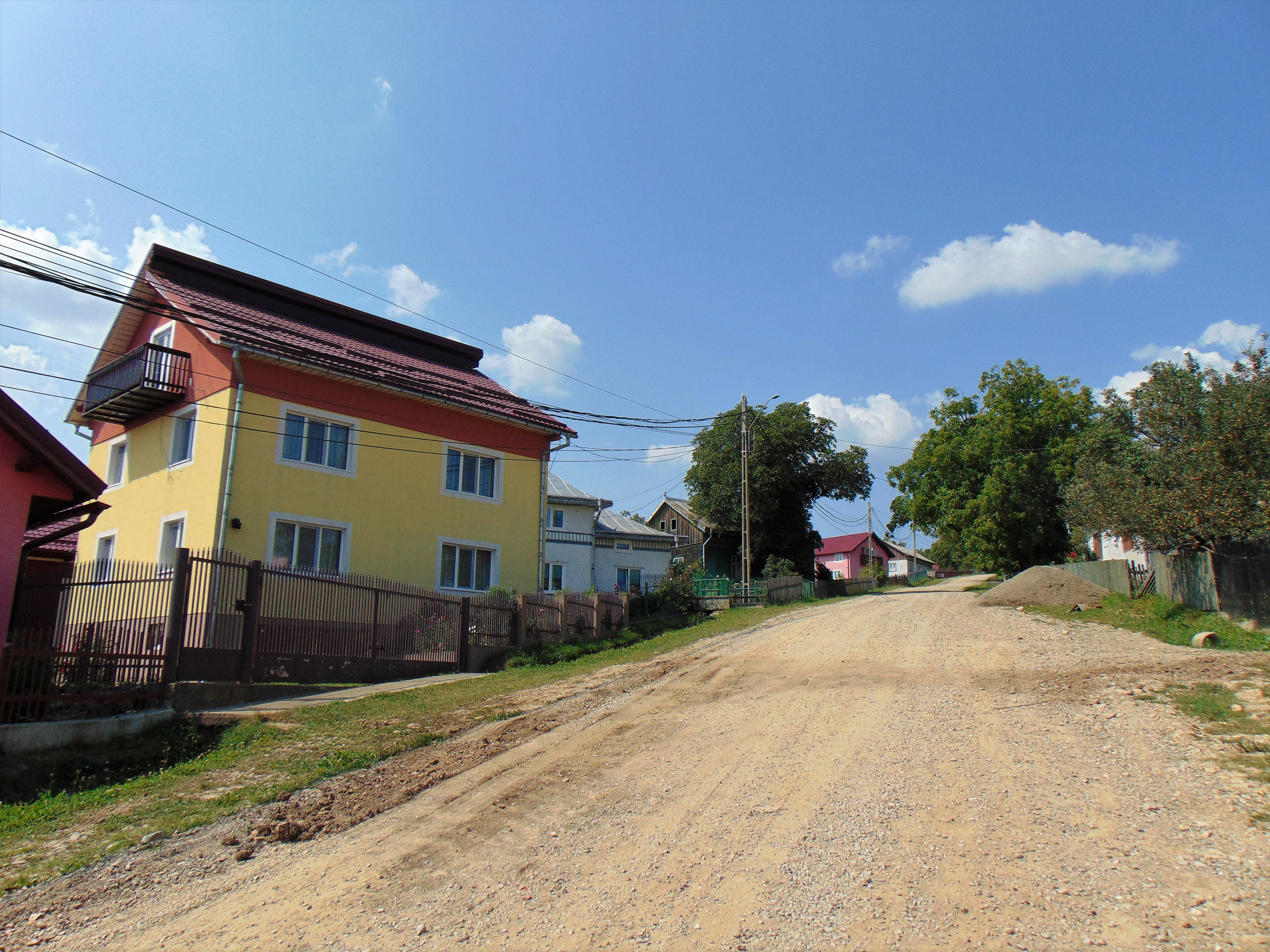
View from the village of Pleșa (Plesza)

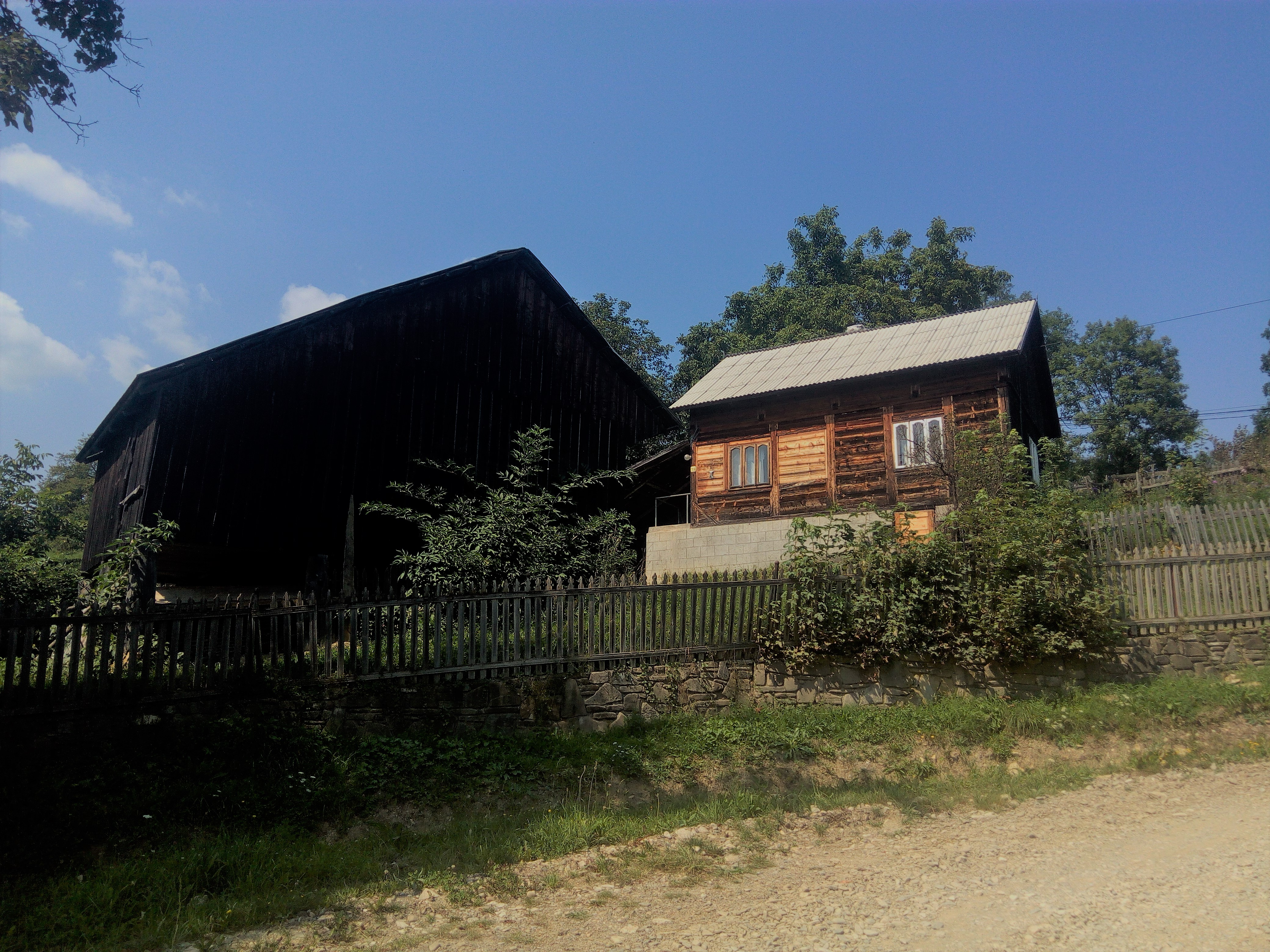
View from the village of Pleșa (Plesza)

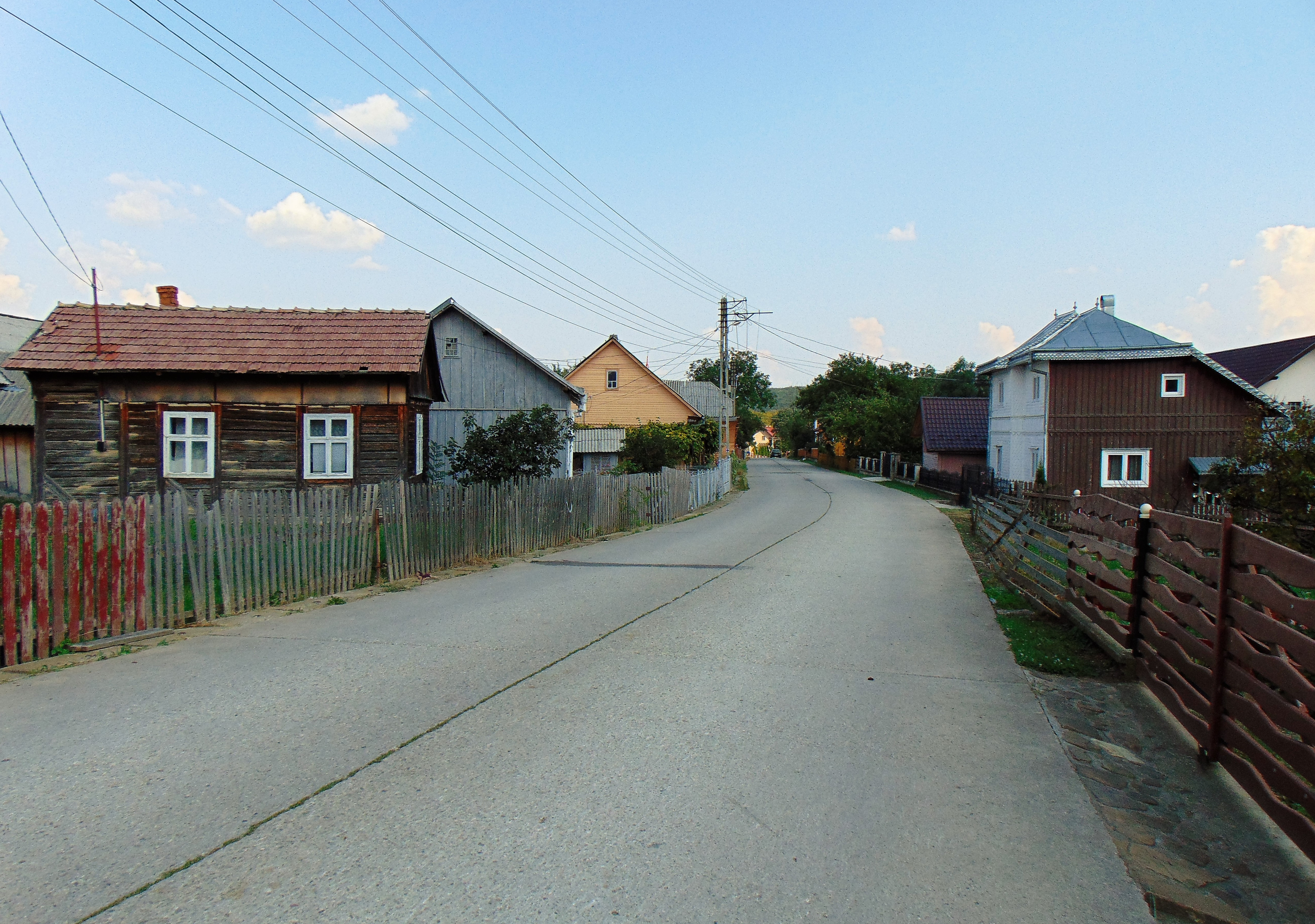
View from Solonețu Nou (Nowy Sołoniec)

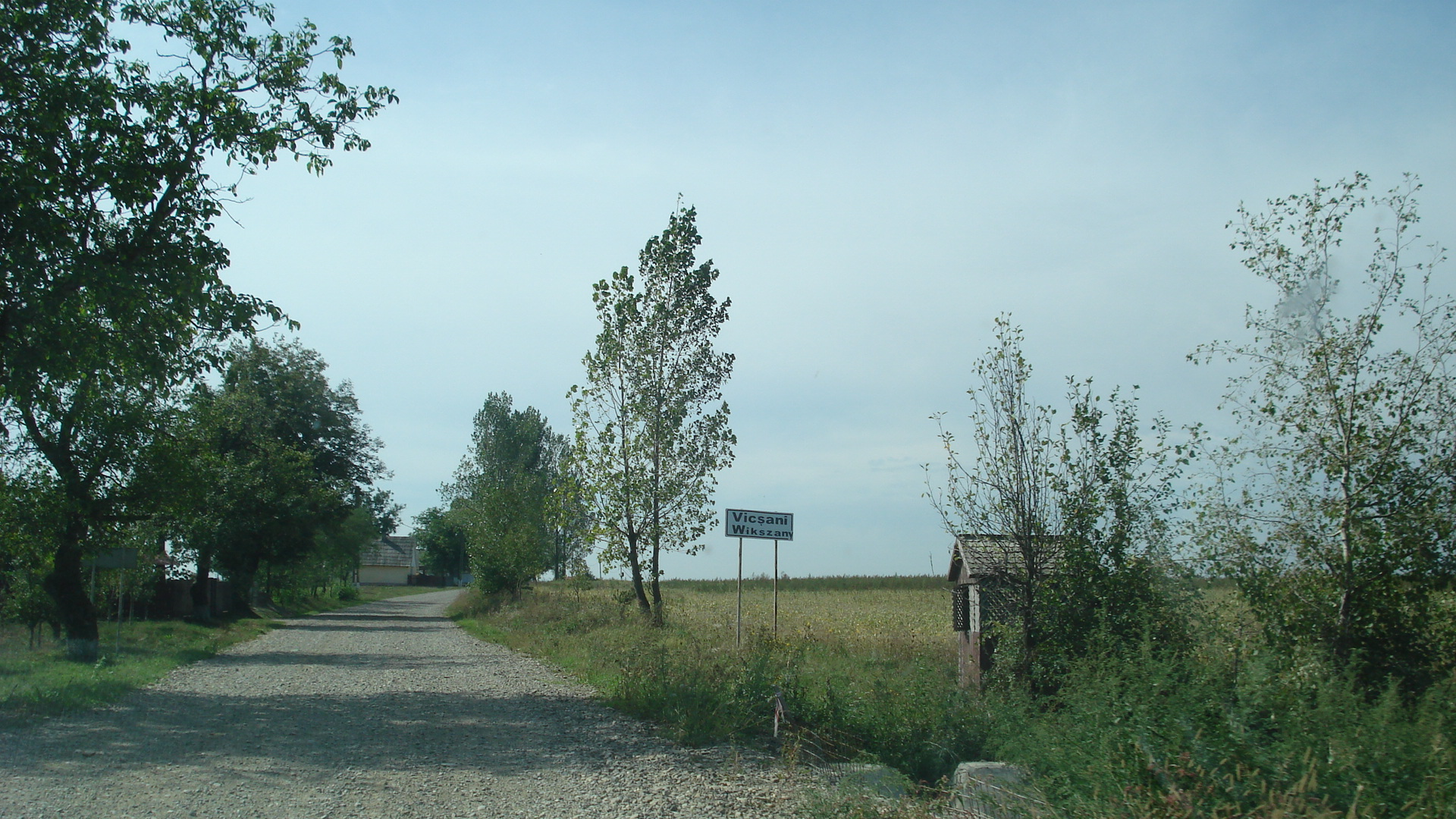
Vicșani (Wickszany)

== See also ==
- Polish–Romanian alliance
- Romanian Bridgehead
- Poland–Romania relations
- Polonia Cernăuți
- Poles in Bulgaria
- Poles in Moldova
- Poles in Hungary
- Poles in Ukraine
- Polish diaspora
- Romanians in Poland
