= Cacica =

Cacica Kaczyka
- Commune
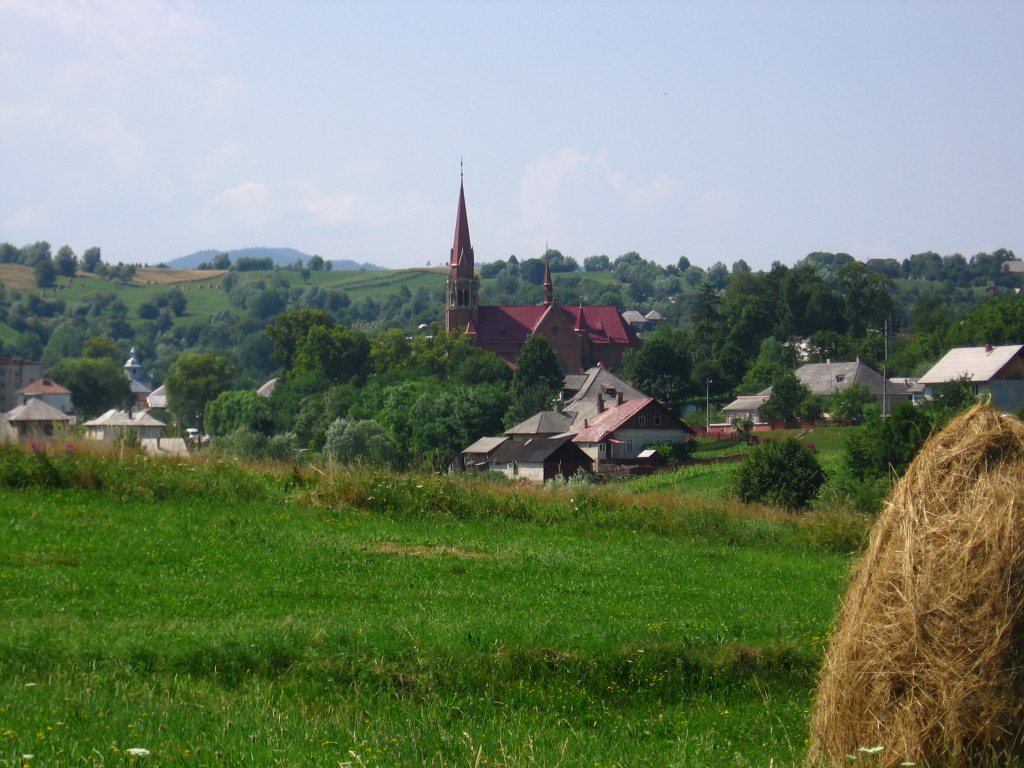
- Panorama

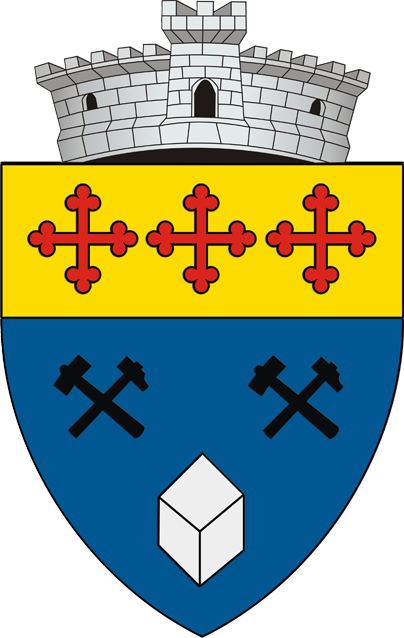
- Coat of arms

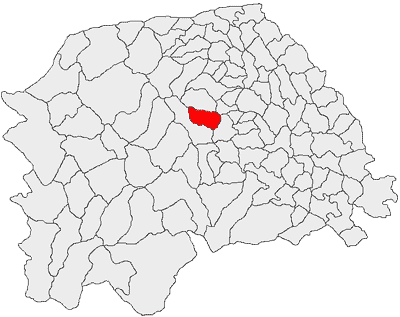
- Location in Suceava County

- Location in Romania
- Coordinates: 47°38′N 25°54′E
- Country: Romania
- County: Suceava

Government
  - Mayor (2020–2024): Petru Tudosi (PNL)
- Area: 57 km^{2} (22 sq mi)
- Elevation: 385 m (1,263 ft)
- Population (2021-12-01): 3,963
  - Density: 70/km^{2} (180/sq mi)
- Time zone: UTC+02:00 (EET)
  - Summer (DST): UTC+03:00 (EEST)
- Postal code: 727095
- Area code: +(40) 230
- Vehicle reg.: SV
- Website: www.comuna-cacica.ro

Cacica (Polish: Kaczyka, German: Kaczika) is a commune in Suceava County, in the historical region of Bukovina, northeastern Romania. The commune is located in the central part of the county, 17 km (11 mi) from the town of Gura Humorului, 34 km (21 mi) from the city of Rădăuți, and 28 km (17 mi) from the county seat, Suceava. At the 2011 census, 74.8% of inhabitants were Romanians, 20.2% Poles, and 4.4% Ukrainians. Its Polish inhabitants are descended from settlers who arrived there at the turn of the 19th century during the Habsburg period.

== Administration and local politics ==
=== Commune council ===
The commune's current local council has the following political composition, according to the results of the 2020 Romanian local elections:

Party	Seats	Current Council
National Liberal Party (PNL)	7	
Social Democratic Party (PSD)	4	
Union of Poles of Romania (UPR)	2	

== Villages ==
The commune is composed of five villages: namely Cacica, Maidan, Pârteștii de Sus (German: Ober-Perteschtie or Ober Pertestie) (the commune center), Runcu, and Solonețu Nou.

=== Solonețu Nou ===
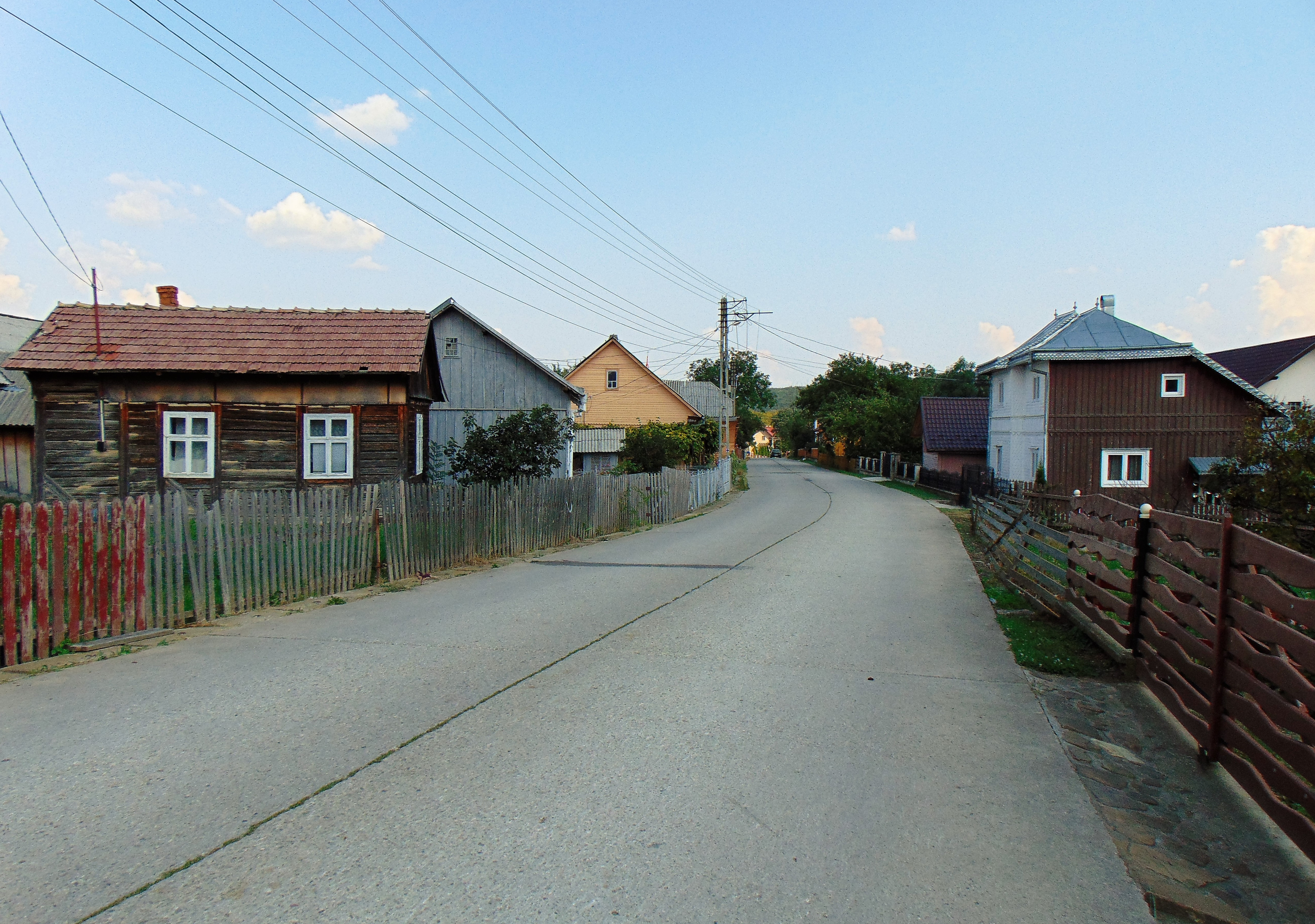
View from the Polish village of Solonețu Nou (2018)

Solonețu Nou (Polish: Nowy Sołoniec; German: Neu-Solonetz) is one of the Polish villages in Suceava County, in the historical region of Bukovina, northeastern Romania. It was established in 1834 by 30 Polish families in the Soloneț river valley.

A Polish school was founded in the village in 1870. 523 people from the village were deported to Poland after 1945 and the school was closed. Some Poles settled in Złotnik, Poland. After the Romanian Revolution of 1989, the Polish school was reopened. In 1995 there were 718 inhabitants in the village. The Polish community from Solonețu Nou (together with those of Solca, Pleșa, Racova, and Arbore) has 365 families with 1046 Roman Catholics of Polish ethnicity.

== Natives ==
- Valeriu Alaci (1884–1955), Romanian mathematician
- Ghervazen Longher (born 1972), Polish-Romanian politician

== Gallery ==
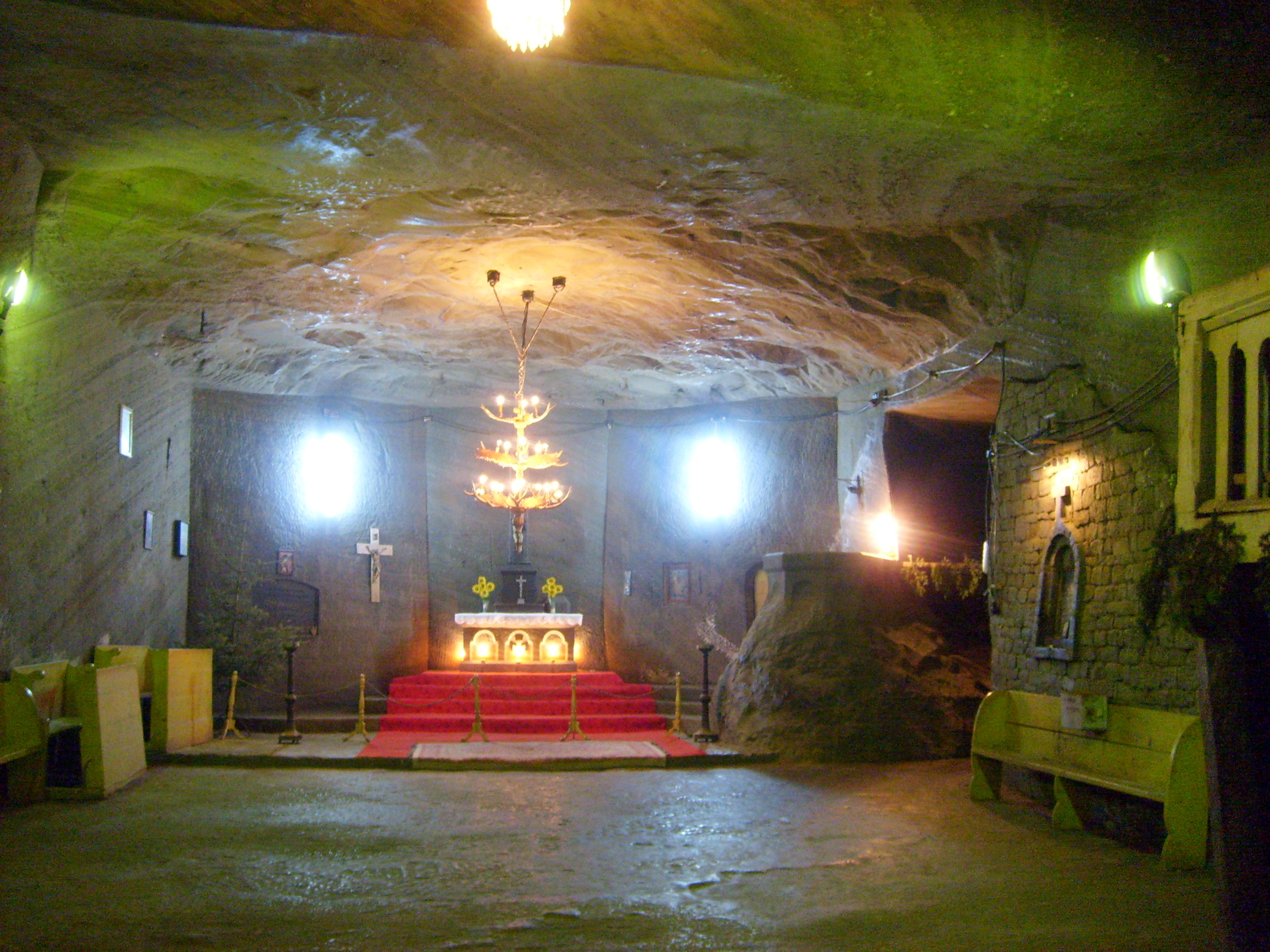
Roman Catholic chapel dedicated to Saint Barbara, located in the salt mine

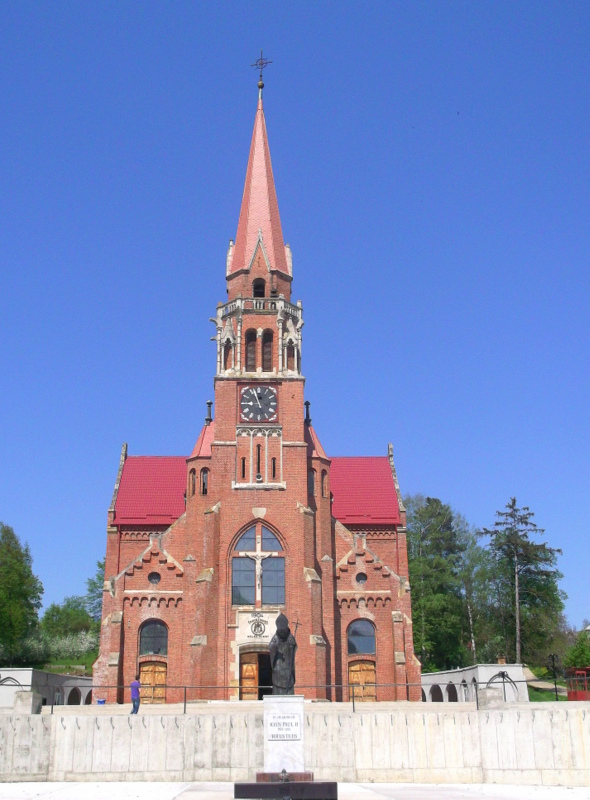
Roman Catholic Polish basilica in Cacica

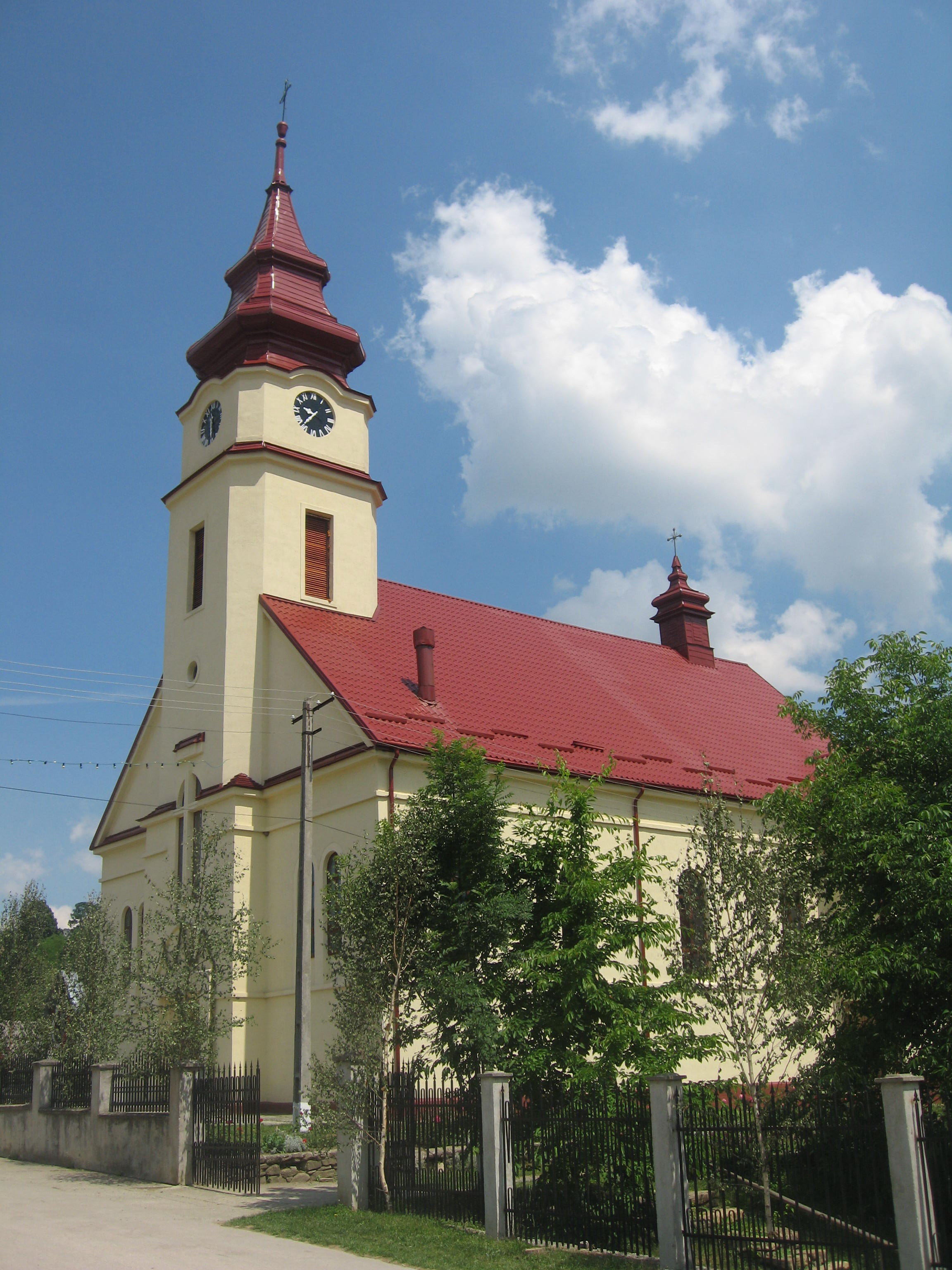
Roman Catholic church in Solonețu Nou

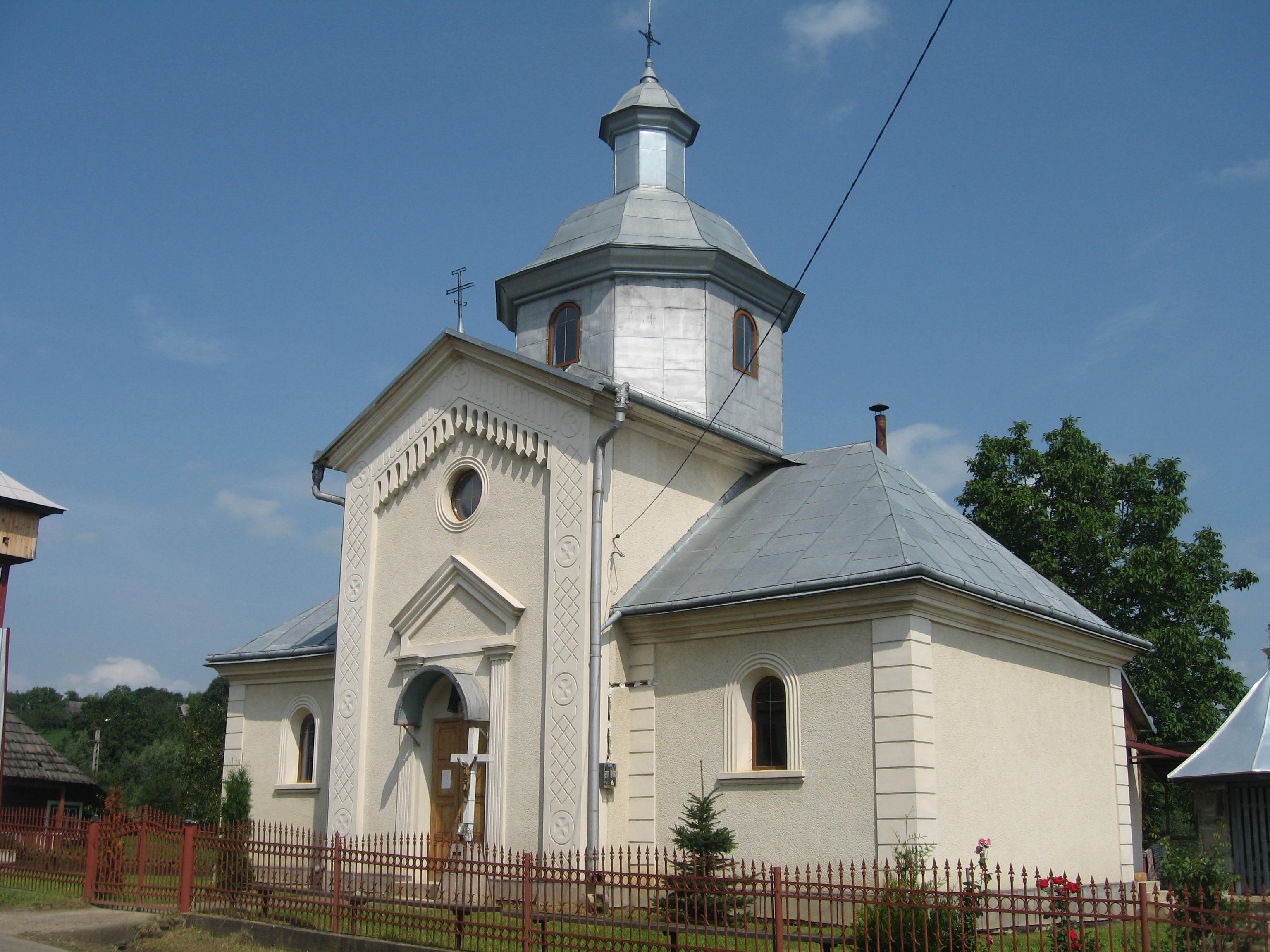
Greek Catholic church in Cacica

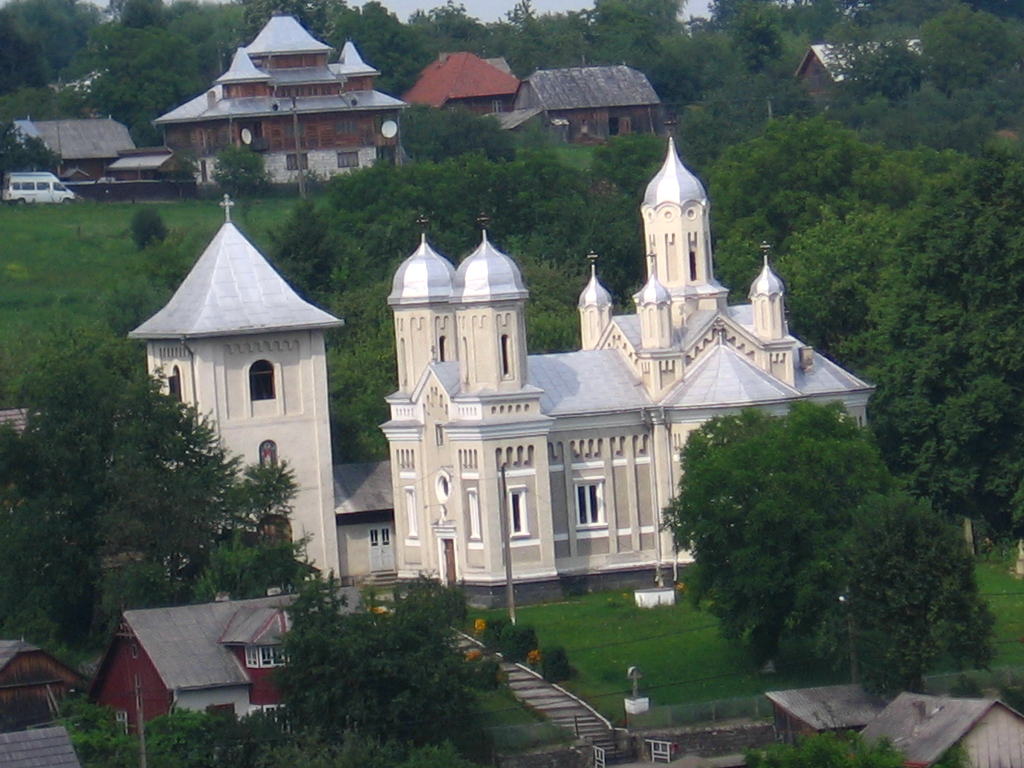
Orthodox church in Cacica

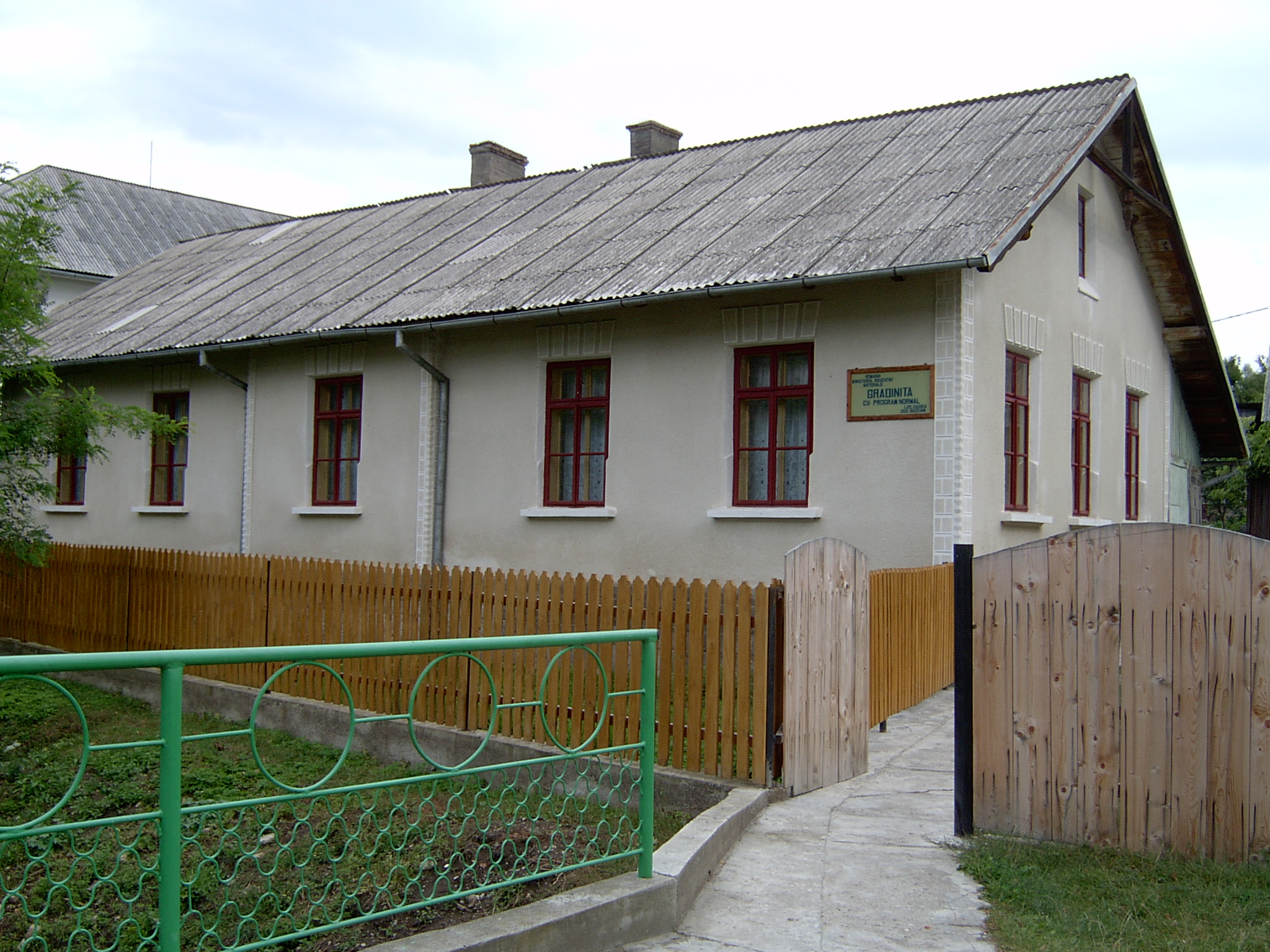
Cacica kindergarten

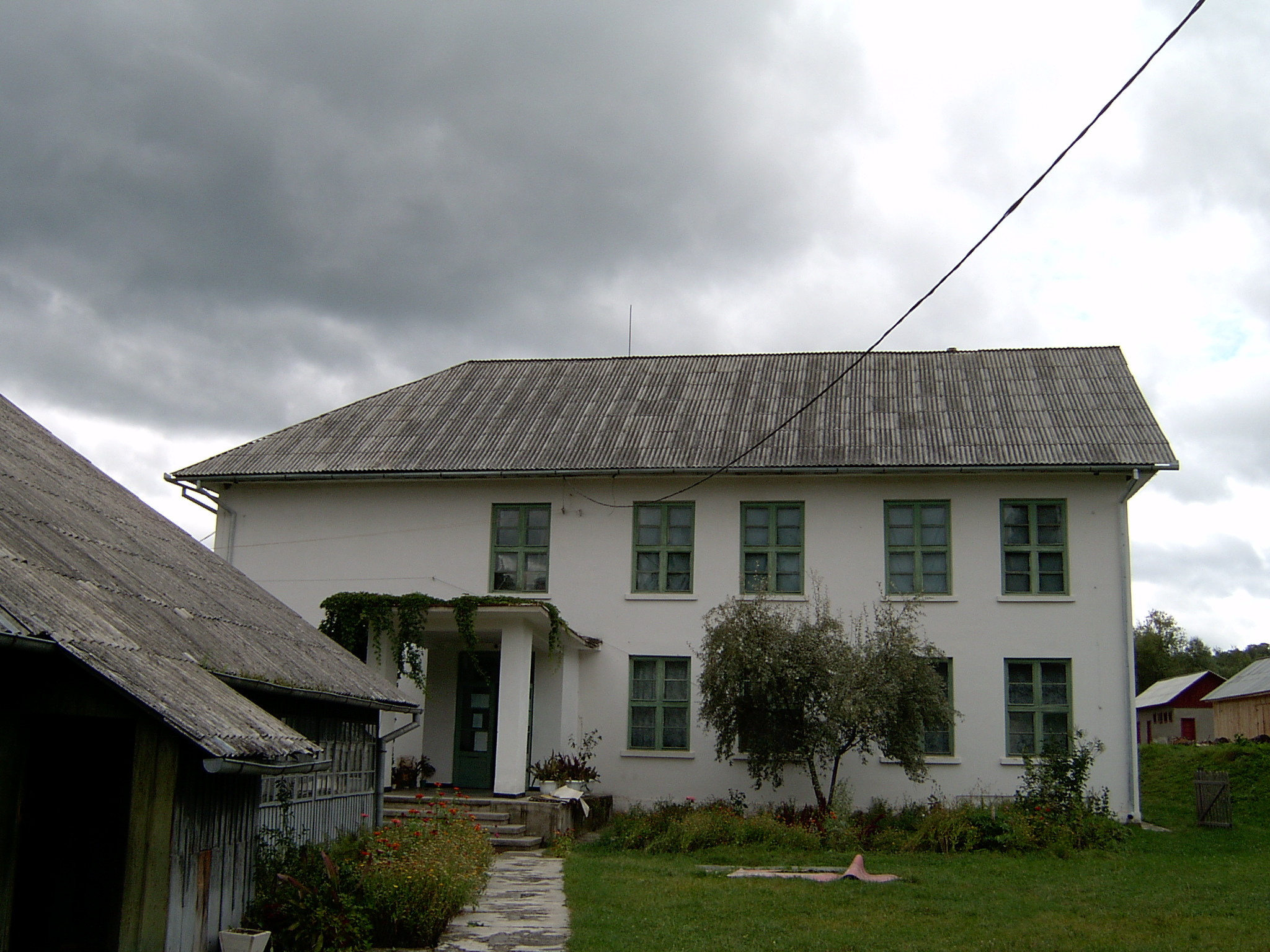
Cacica elementary school

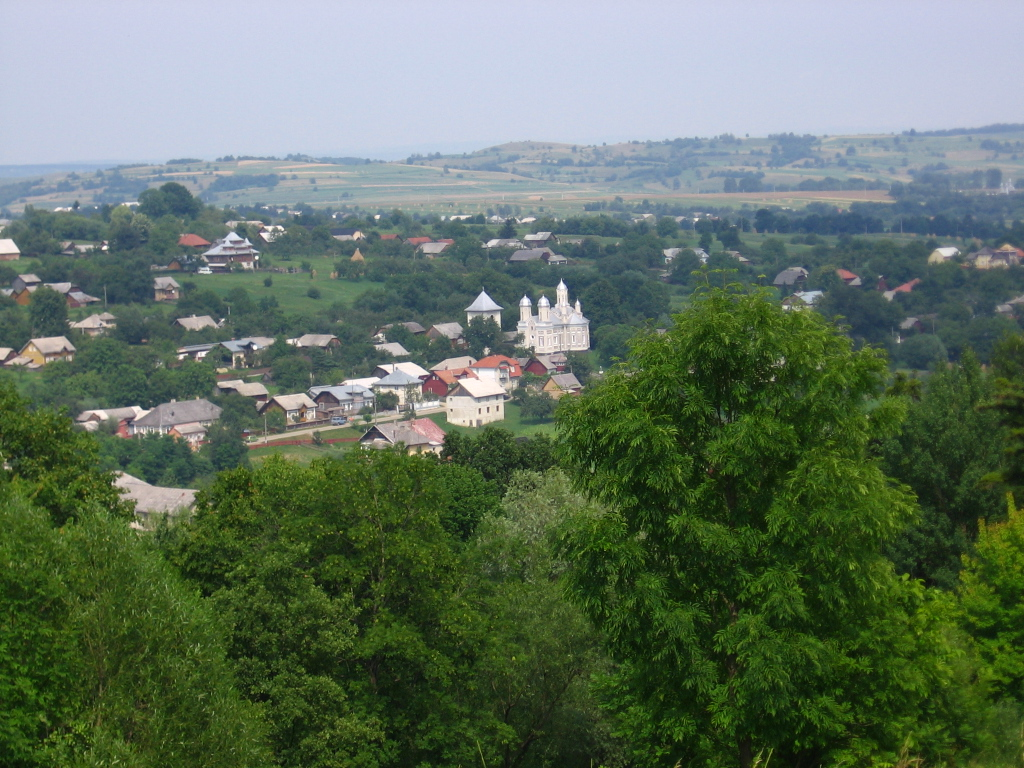
Panoramic view over Cacica, with the Orthodox church in the background

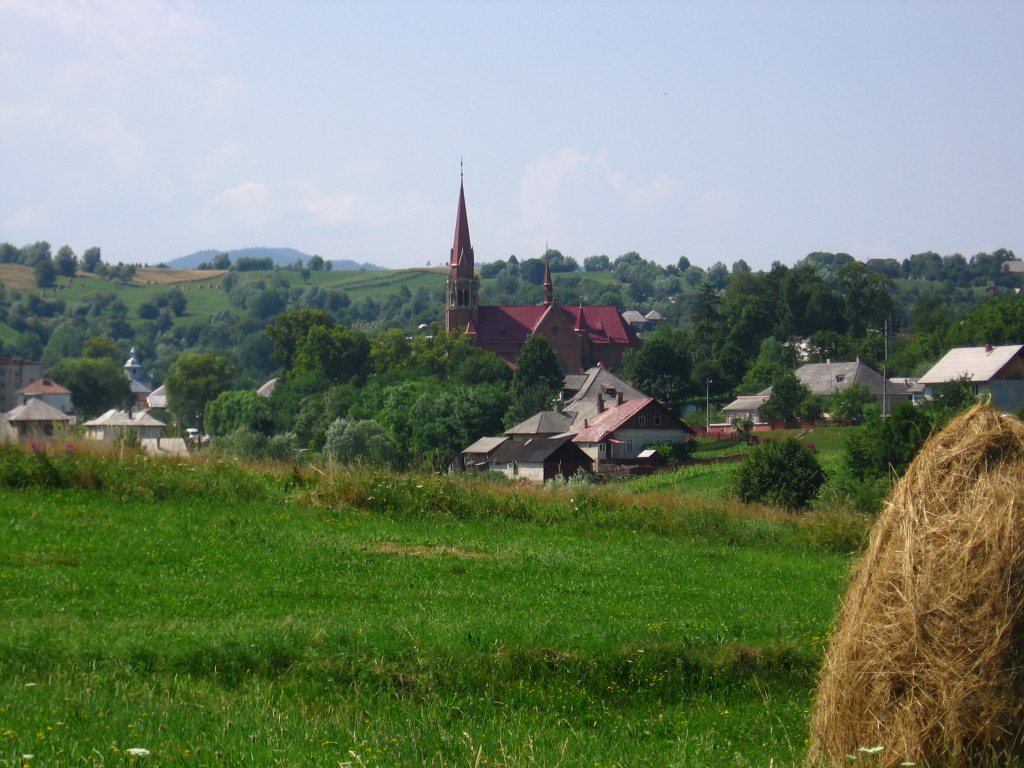
Panoramic view over Cacica, with the Roman Catholic basilica seen in the background

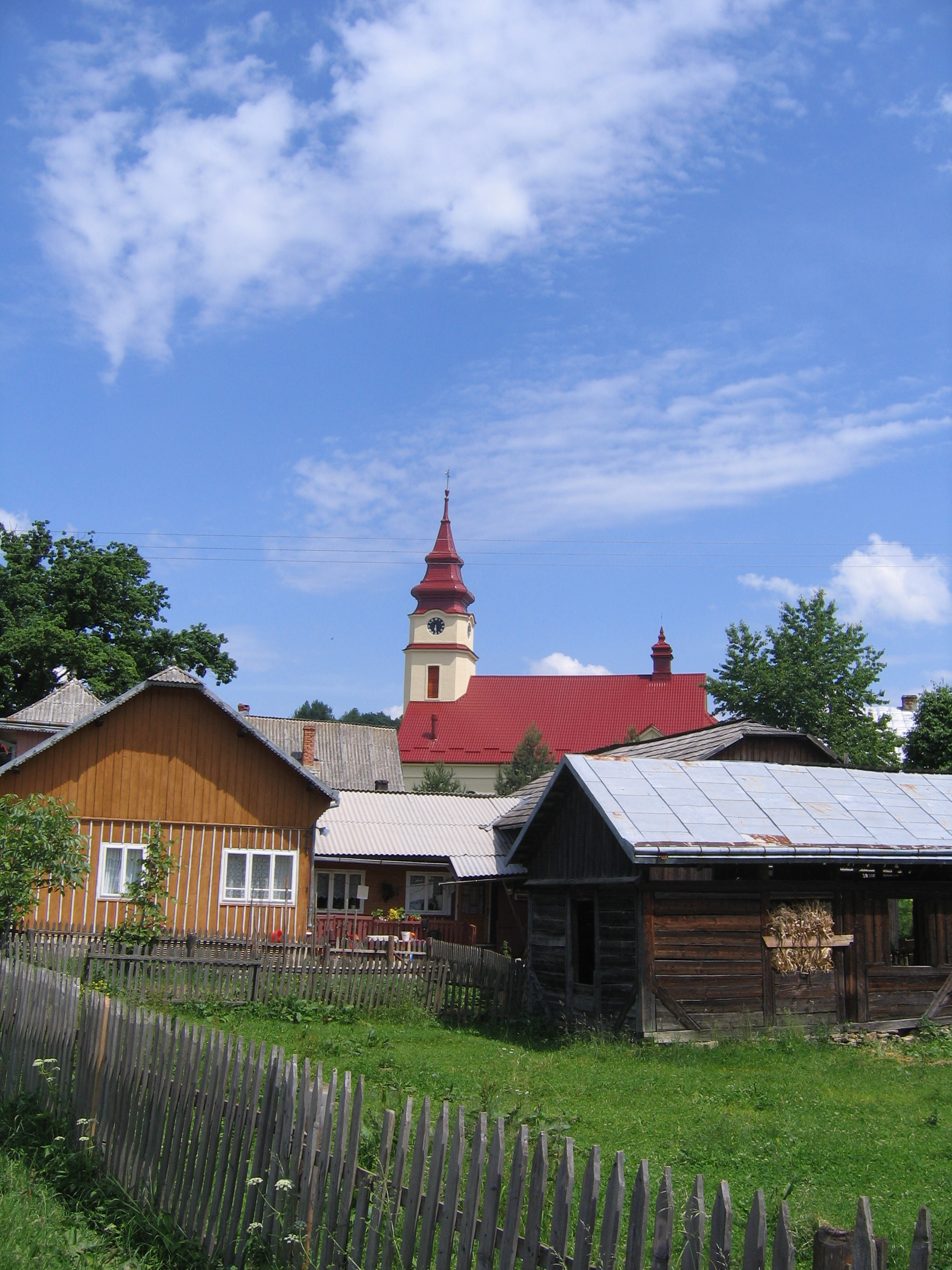
Solonețu Nou (Polish: Nowy Sołoniec) village, with the local Roman Catholic church seen in the background

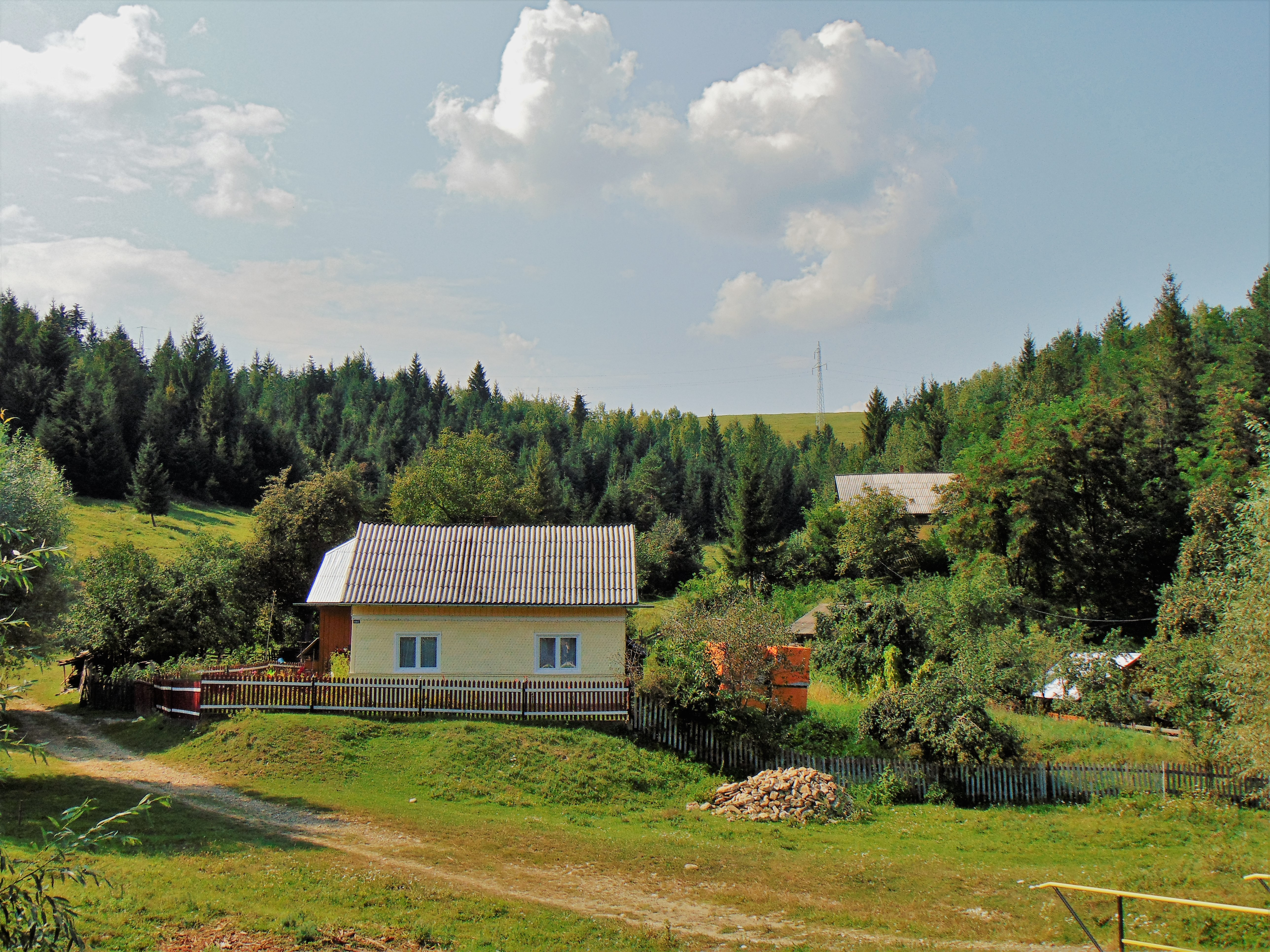
Rural landscape from Solonețu Nou (2018)

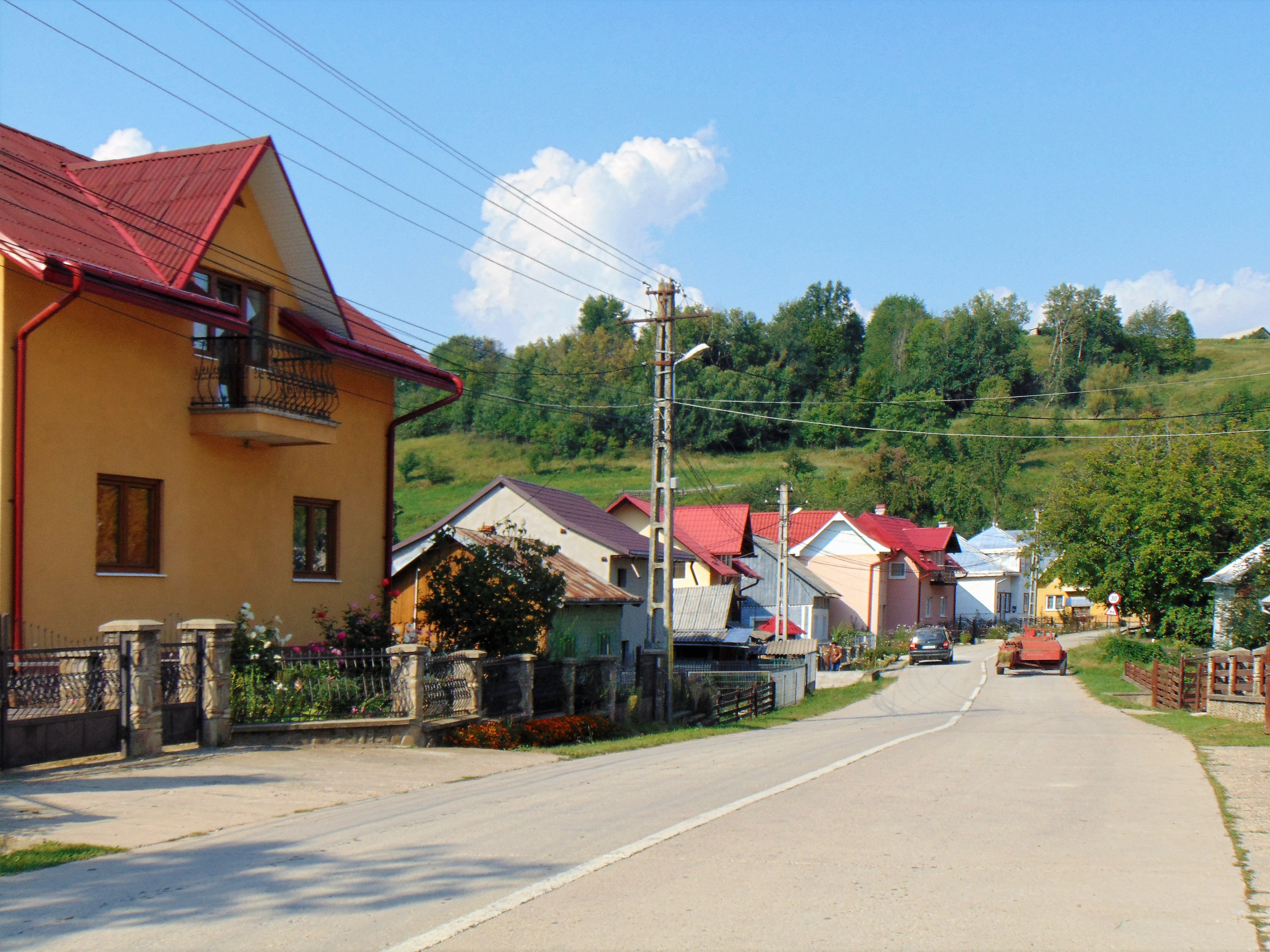
Solonețu Nou (2018)

== See also ==
- Polish minority in Romania
