= Union of Poles of Romania =

Union of Poles of Romania Uniunea Polonezilor din România Związek Polaków w Rumunii "Dom Polski"
- Founded: 16 March 1990
- Headquarters: Str. Ioan Vodă Viteazu nr. 5, Suceava, Suceava County, Romania
- Ideology: Polish minority interests
- National affiliation: National Minorities Parliamentary Group
- Chamber of Deputies: 1 / 330
- Senate: 0 / 136
- European Parliament: 0 / 33

Website
- dompolski.ro

The Union of Poles of Romania (Romanian: Uniunea Polonezilor din România, UPR; Polish: Związek Polaków w Rumunii "Dom Polski"), or Dom Polski, is an ethnic minority political party in Romania representing the Polish community.

== History ==
The UPR was registered on 16 March 1990. Xenia Grabska-Stoica was the first president of the union, and Andrei Răuță and Mihai Rainer were the deputy-presidents; Antoni Rojowski was the first chairman. The party contested the May 1990 general elections, and despite receiving only 2,372 votes (0.02%), it won a single seat in the Chamber of Deputies (taken by Antoni Linzmeier) under the electoral law that allows for political parties representing ethnic minority groups to be exempt from the electoral threshold.

At the party congress held in Suceava on 13 and 14 April 1991, Rojowski was re-elected president, serving until 1994. The headquarters of the organisation were moved to Suceava shortly afterwards. Antoni Rojowski was president until 1994. Iohan-Peter Babiaș served as president from 1994 until 2002. He was succeeded by Ghervazen Longher. In 2013, after hiring his brother and sister to his parliamentary office, Longher was convicted. In the 2016 elections Victoria Longher, the wife of Ghervazen, was elected to parliament on as the party's representative.

== Structure ==
The Union of Poles of Romania is the only Polish organisation in Romania. The Union operates mainly for the purpose of preserving traditions, teaching the Polish language, maintaining relations with Poland and protecting Polish communities in Romania. The organisation has 15 local associations, in Bucharest, Constanța, Craiova, Iași, Suceava, Siret, Rădăuți, Vicșani, Solonețu Nou, Cacica, Pleșa, Poiana Micului, Păltinoasa, Gura Humorului, and Moara. The headquarters of the Union leadership is located in the Polish House in Suceava, built between 1903 and 1907 and regained by the community in 1996.

== Electoral history ==
Election	Chamber of Deputies			Senate		
Election	Votes	%	Seats	Votes	%	Seats
1990	2,372	0.02	1	848	0.01	0
1992	3,013	0.03	1			
1996	1,842	0.02	1	–	–	–
2000	5,055	0.04	1	–	–	–
2004	5,473	0.05	1			
2008	7,670	0.11	1	–	–	–
2012	8,023	0.11	1	–	–	–
2016	3,355	0.05	1	–	–	–
2020	3,750	0.06	1	–	–	–
