= Ghervazen Longher =

Romanian politician (born 1972)

Ghervazen Longher (Polish: Gerwazy Longher, born January 3, 1972) is a Romanian politician, and a political leader of the Polish minority in Romania. He has been a member of the Chamber of Deputies since 2004. Longher was born in Cacica, Suceava County.

In June 2014, MP Ghervazen Longher was sentenced by the Romanian High Court of Cassation and Justice to three months suspended imprisonment for the crime of conflict of interest. Ghervazen Longher illegally hired his brother and sister in the Chamber of Deputies.

After being given a suspended prison sentence, Ghervazen Longher's place as a Member of Parliament was taken by his wife, Victoria Longher.
