= Găureni =

Găureni may refer to several places:

- Găureni, a village in Miroslava Commune, Iași County, Romania
- Găureni, a village in Zîmbreni Commune, Ialoveni district, Moldova
- Găureni, a village in Bălănești Commune, Nisporeni district, Moldova
- Găureni, a river in Iași County and Vaslui County, Romania, tributary of the Bârlad
- Găureni (Țibleș), a river in Bistrița-Năsăud County, Romania, tributary of the Țibleș
- Găureni, the former name of Alunișul village, Zagra Commune, Bistrița-Năsăud County, Romania
- Găureni, the former name of Dumbrava village, Grănicești Commune, Suceava County, Romania
