= Zagra =

Zagra may refer to:

- Zagra, Iran, a village in Ardabil Province, Iran
- Zagra, Granada
- Zagra, Bistrița-Năsăud, Romania
- Zagra River
