= Țibleș (Brad) =

- Location within Romania

Location
- Country: Romania
- Counties: Maramureș County

Physical characteristics
- Source: Mount Țibleș
  - location: Țibleș Mountains
  - coordinates: 47°31′24″N 24°15′20″E
  - elevation: 1,686 m (5,531 ft)
- Mouth: Brad
  - coordinates: 47°31′07″N 24°10′44″E
  - elevation: 674 m (2,211 ft)
- Length: 7 km (4.3 mi)
- Basin size: 16 km^{2} (6.2 sq mi)

Basin features
- Progression: Brad→ Suciu→ Lăpuș→ Someș→ Tisza→ Danube→ Black Sea

The Țibleș is a tributary of the river Brad in Romania. It flows into the Brad 9 km east of Groșii Țibleșului. Its length is 7 km (4.3 mi) and its basin size is 16 km^{2} (6.2 sq mi). Its source is on Mount Țibleș, close to the source of another, larger river also named Țibleș, that flows south to the Someșul Mare.
