= Țibleș =

Țibleș may refer to the following places in Romania:

- Țibleș (Brad), a tributary of the Brad in Maramureș County
- Țibleș (Someșul Mare), a tributary of the Someșul Mare in Bistrița-Năsăud County, Romania
- Țibleș Mountains, a mountain range in Maramureș County
