= Szőcs =

Szőcs (Hungarian: [ˈsøːt͡ʃ]) is a Hungarian surname. Notable people with this surname include:

- Bernadette Szőcs (b. 1995) Romanian table tennis player
- Emőke Szőcs (b, 1985) Hungarian biathlete, Olympian
- Géza Szőcs (1953–2020) ethnic Hungarian poet and politician from Transylvania, Romania
- Hunor Szőcs (b. 1992) Romanian table tennis player
- László Szőcs (b. 1984) Romanian futsal player
- Réka Szőcs (b. 1989) Hungarian female association football goalkeeper
- Zsuzsanna Szőcs (b. 1962) Hungarian fencer, Olympic bronze medalist

== See also ==
- Suciu (disambiguation), the Romanian-language cognate of Szőcs
