= Pojény =

Pojény is the Hungarian name for two villages in Romania:

- Poienile Zagrei village, Zagra Commune, Bistriţa-Năsăud County
- Poieni village, Densuş Commune, Hunedoara County
