= Suciu =

Suciu is a Romanian surname and may refer to:

== People ==
- Alexandru Suciu (born 1960), footballer
- Alin Suciu (born 1978), Coptologist
- Aurel Suciu (1853–1898), signatory of the Transylvanian Memorandum
- Coriolan Suciu (1895–1967), historian and Greek-Catholic priest
- Dan Suciu (born 1957), American computer scientist
- Daniel Suciu (born 1980), politician
- Ioan Suciu (1907–1953), Greek-Catholic bishop and victim of the communist regime
- Ioan Silviu Suciu (born 1977), gymnast
- Lucreția Suciu-Rudow (1859–1900), poet
- Mark Suciu (born 1992), skateboarder
- Sebastian Suciu (born 1986), politician
- Sergiu Suciu (born 1990), footballer
- Vasile Suciu (bishop) (1873–1935), Greek-Catholic metropolitan bishop and theologian
- Vasile Suciu (footballer) (1942–2013), footballer

== Places ==
- Suciu de Sus, a commune in Maramureș County, and its village of Suciu de Jos
- Suciu (river), a tributary of the Lăpuș in Maramureș County
