= Groșii Țibleșului =

- Commune
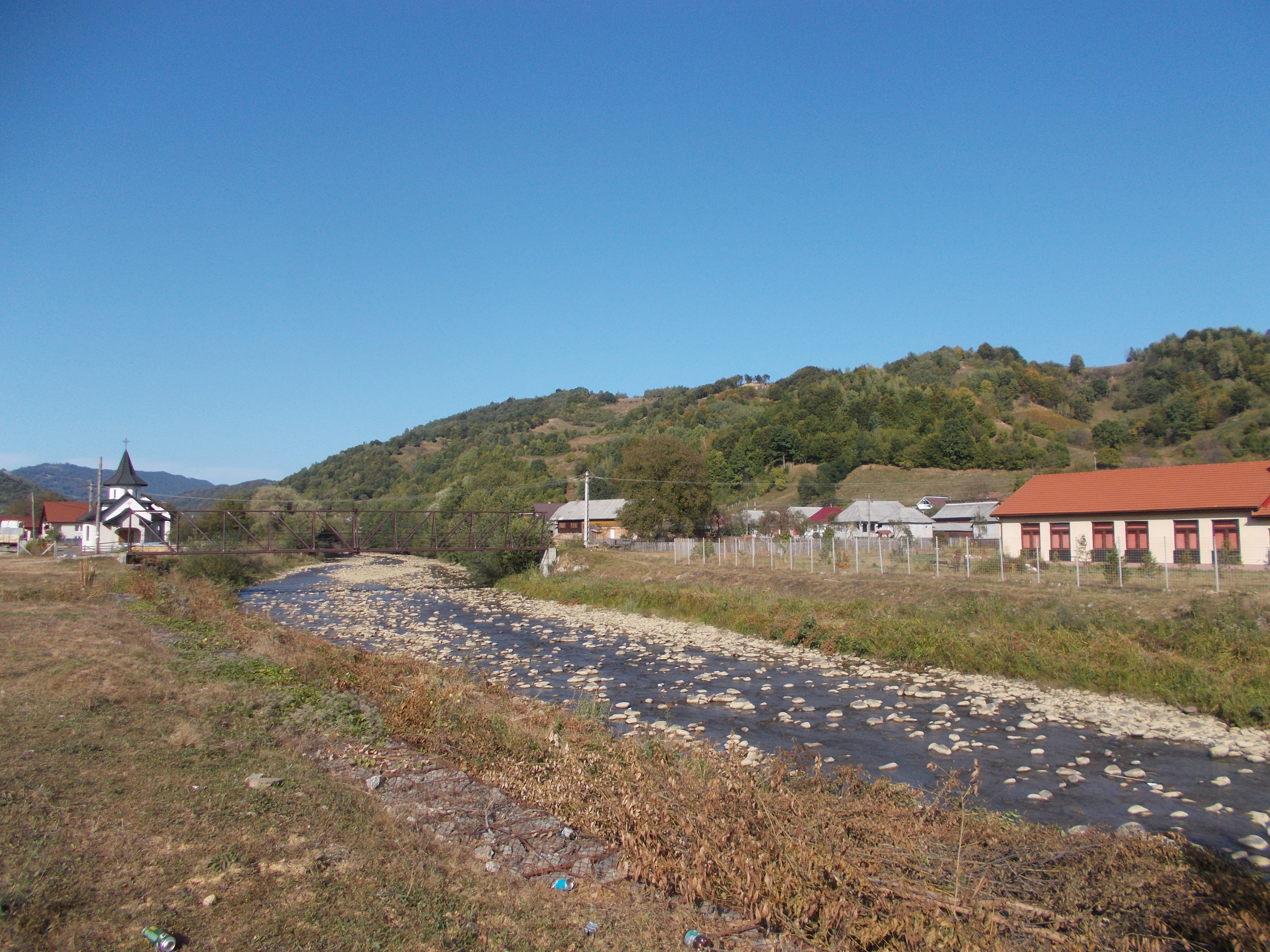
- Groșii Țibleșului

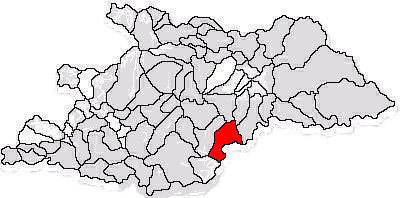
- Location in Maramureș County

- Location in Romania
- Coordinates: 47°29′N 24°4′E
- Country: Romania
- County: Maramureș

Government
  - Mayor (2020–2024): Nicolaie Burzo (PNL)
- Area: 123.40 km^{2} (47.65 sq mi)
- Elevation: 489 m (1,604 ft)
- Population (2021-12-01): 2,103
  - Density: 17.04/km^{2} (44.14/sq mi)
- Time zone: UTC+02:00 (EET)
  - Summer (DST): UTC+03:00 (EEST)
- Postal code: 437316
- Area code: +(40) 262
- Vehicle reg.: MM
- Website: grosiitiblesului.ro

Groșii Țibleșului (Hungarian: Tőkés) is a commune in Maramureș County, Transylvania, Romania. It is composed of a single village, Groșii Țibleșului, which split off in 2003 from the Suciu de Sus commune to form the present commune.

The commune is situated at the foot of the Țibleș Mountains, at an altitude of 489 m (1,604 ft). It lies on the banks of the river Suciu and its left tributary, the river Brad. Groșii Țibleșului is located in the southern part of Maramureș County, on the border with Bistrița-Năsăud County, at a distance of 22 km (14 mi) from Târgu Lăpuș and 80 km (50 mi) from the county seat, Baia Mare.

Historical population
Year	Pop.	±%
1880	1,335	—
1900	1,614	+20.9%
1910	1,657	+2.7%
1930	1,803	+8.8%
1956	2,078	+15.3%
1977	2,422	+16.6%
1992	2,298	−5.1%
2002	2,124	−7.6%
2011	2,095	−1.4%
2021	2,103	+0.4%
Source: Census data

At the 2011 census, the commune had 2,095 inhabitants, of which 91.3% were Romanians, 6.9% Hungarians, and 1.8% Roma. At the 2021 census, Groșii Țibleșului had a population of 2,103; of those, 94.2% were Romanians and 1.9% Hungarians.
