= Reformed Church, Târgu Lăpuș =

Church in Târgu Lăpuş, Romania

Coordinates: 47°27′9.41″N 23°51′57.97″E

Reformed Church
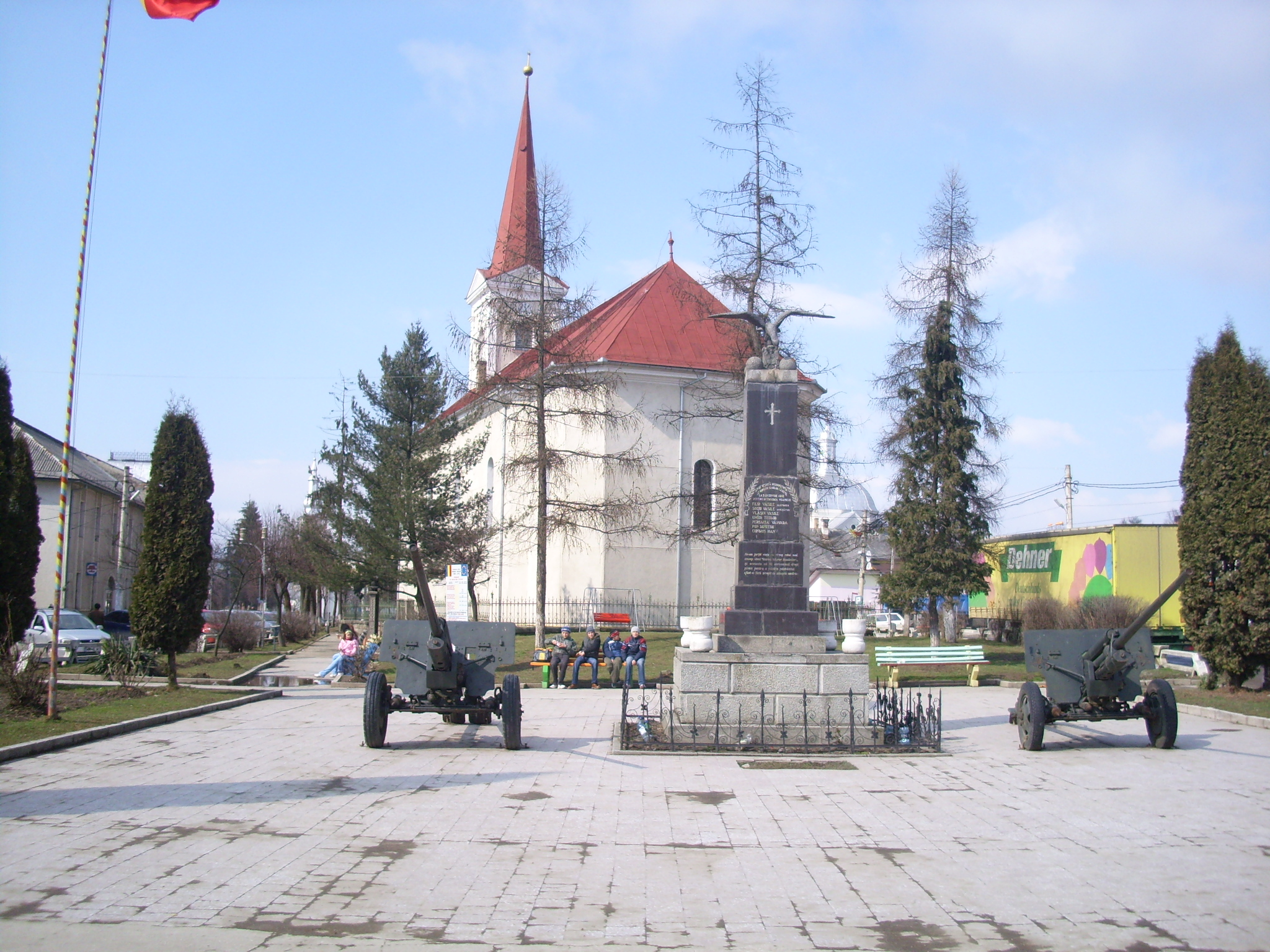
- Union Monument and Reformed Church

Religion
- Year consecrated: 1863

Location
- Municipality: Târgu Lăpuş
- Interactive map of Reformed Church

Architecture
- Groundbreaking: 1836
- Completed: 1863

The Reformed Church (Romanian: Biserica Reformată; Hungarian: Református templom) is a church in Târgu Lăpuş, Romania, completed in 1863.

== Gallery ==
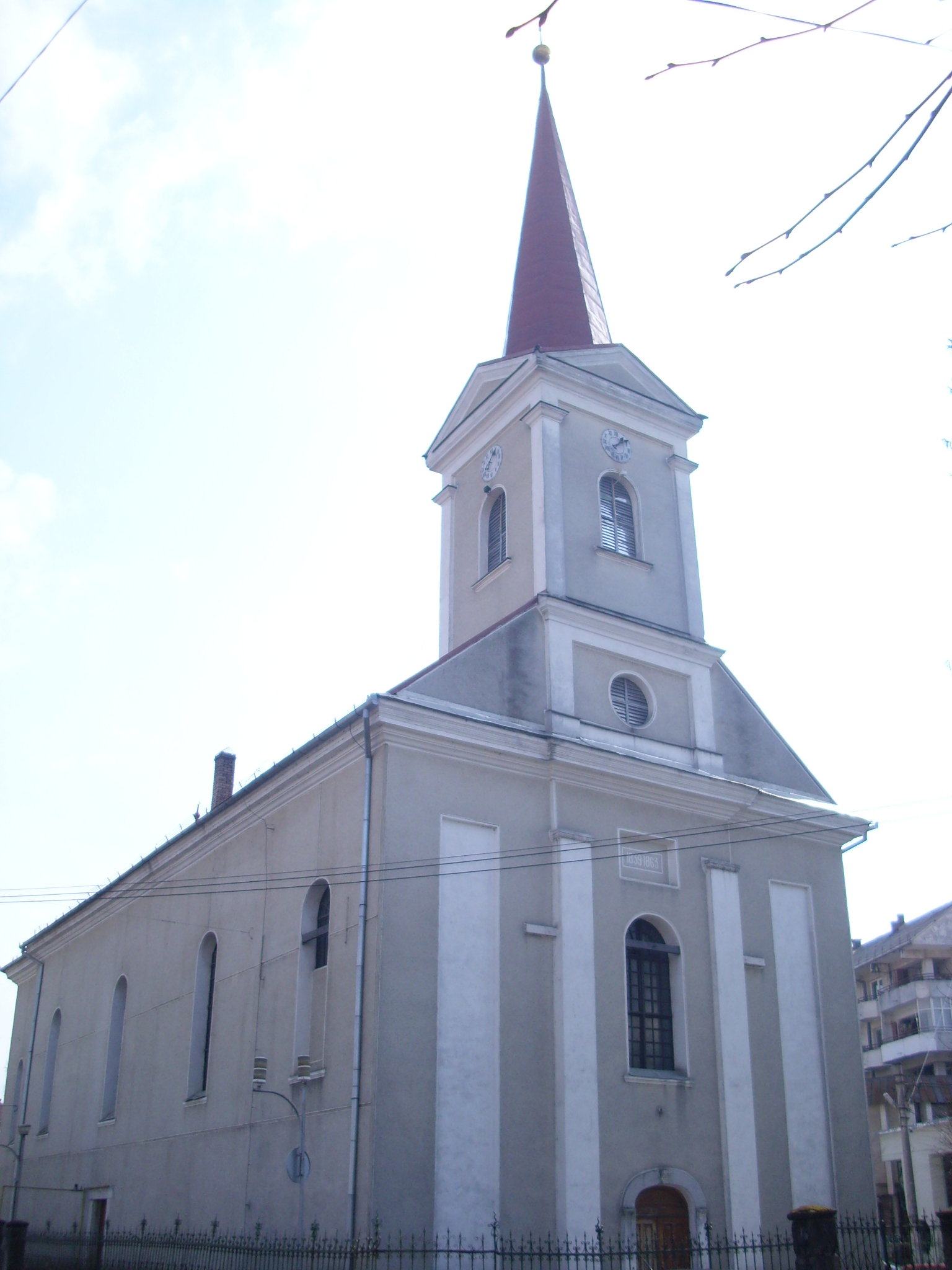

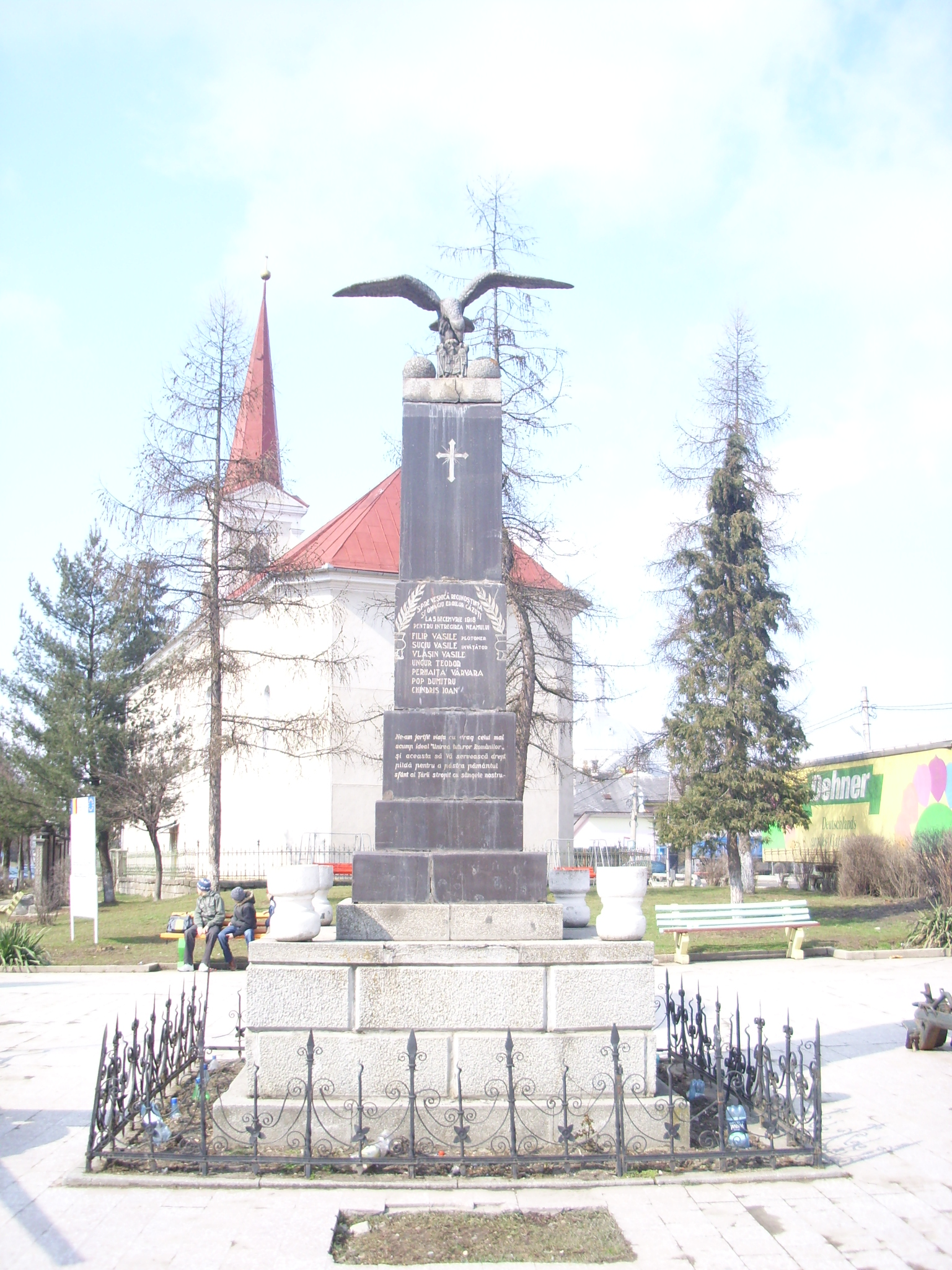
The Reformed Church and the Union Monument

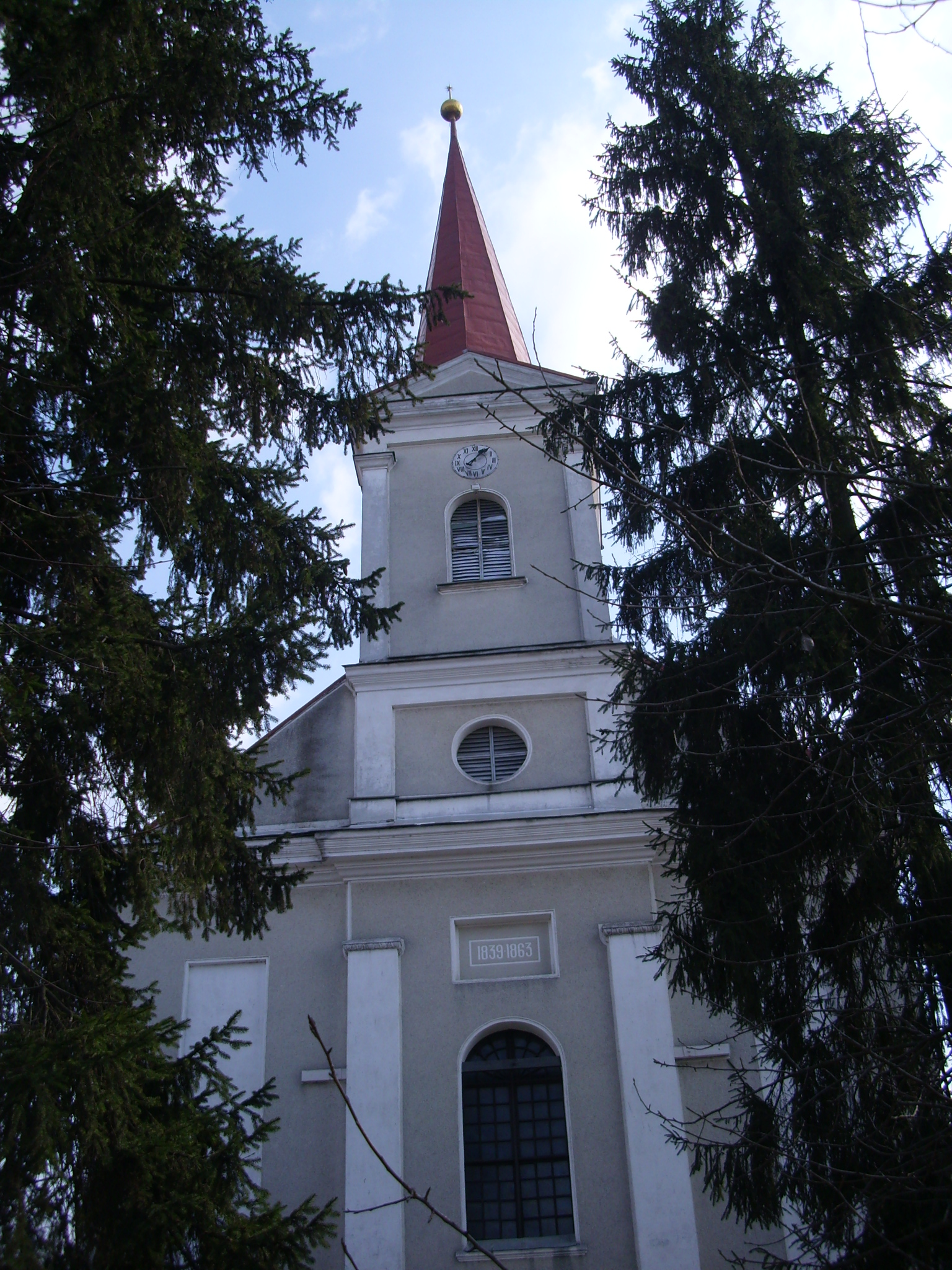
