= Răzoare mine =

Manganese mine in Romania

- Location: Târgu Lăpuș, Maramureș County, Romania
- Products: Manganese
- Production: 18,000 tonnes
- Opened: 1988
- Closed: 2006
- Company: MinBucovina

The Răzoare mine was a large mine in the north of Romania in Maramureș County, 43 km (27 mi) southeast of Baia Mare and 507 km (315 mi) north of the capital, Bucharest. Răzoare represents one of the largest manganese reserve in Romania having estimated reserves of 5 million tonnes of manganese.

The mine opened in 1988 and closed in 2006.
