= Găureni (Țibleș) =

- Location within Romania

Location
- Country: Romania
- Counties: Bistrița-Năsăud County
- Villages: Alunișul, Zagra

Physical characteristics
- Mouth: Țibleș
  - location: Zagra
  - coordinates: 47.3179°N 24.2750°E
- Length: 12 km (7.5 mi)
- Basin size: 23 km^{2} (8.9 sq mi)

Basin features
- Progression: Țibleș→ Someșul Mare→ Someș→ Tisza→ Danube→ Black Sea

The Găureni is a left tributary of the river Țibleș in Romania. It flows into the Țibleș in Zagra. Its length is 12 km (7.5 mi) and its basin size is 23 km^{2} (8.9 sq mi).
