= Herman Berkovits =

Romanian-Israeli pediatrist (born 1947)

- הרמן ברקוביץ
- Born: March 14, 1947 (age 79); Târgu Lăpuș, Kingdom of Romania
- Education: Iuliu Hațieganu University of Medicine and Pharmacy
- Occupation: physician
- Known for: personal physician of Benjamin Netanyahu
- Political party: Democratic-Liberal Party (2008)

Herman Berkovits (Hebrew: הרמן ברקוביץ; born 14 March 1947) is a Romanian-Israeli pediatrician, best known for being the personal physician of the Israeli Prime Minister Benjamin Netanyahu. He is the honorary consul of Romania in Israel. He also served as an honorary advisor to the Romanian Prime Ministers Viorica Dăncilă, Ludovic Orban, Florin Cîțu, Nicolae Ciucă and Marcel Ciolacu.

== Early life in Romania ==
Berkovits was born on March 14, 1947, in Târgu Lăpuș, in Romania. He graduated the Iuliu Hațieganu University of Medicine and Pharmacy in 1971, and then worked as a pediatrist in villages of the Maramureș and Suceava counties.

== Career in Israel ==
Berkovits emigrated with his family to Israel in 1975. He worked at the Bikur Cholim and Hadassah hospitals in Jerusalem, before opening his own clinic in 1985.

He befriended Netanyahu in the 1990s, when Netanyahu was treated by Berkovits at his clinic, and the two became close friends. When Netanyahu became Prime Minister, he nominated Berkovits to be his personal physician.

He maintains close ties to his native Romania and often visits the country. He said in an interview for the Romanian press that Netanyahu knows everything about Romania, thanks to him. In 2015, after the Colectiv nightclub fire tragedy, he donated 150.000 euros to the hospitals of Romania and he personally organised the treatment of the Romanian patients sent to Israel.

In 2018, he was nominated as honorary advisor to the Romanian Prime Minister Viorica Dăncilă and he has served in this position for all the Romanian Prime Ministers since then. He was decorated by Klaus Iohannis with the National Order of Merit, and he received the doctor honoris causa title from various universities in Romania.

== Political views ==
In a 2014 interview for the Romanian newschannel Digi24, he claimed that he is apolitical, and that his views are shaped by his friendship with Benjamin Netanyahu. Regarding the Israeli-Palestinian peace process, he declared that "if the Palestinians wanted peace, we'd have been at peace a long time ago. Mr. Netanyahu wants peace as well, but there must be two to dance the tango".

After the 2023 Hamas-led attack on Israel, he claimed that he was shocked, and that Hamas killed Israeli citizens of all ethno-religious groups, including Arab Muslims and Christians. He declared that "The Gaza Strip is receiving energy and water from Israel. If we shut down the energy and water, we kill everyone out there. They do not understand that we are a strong country with fantastic technology and, of course, everything that is happening now, every wound, every hurt is a pain for us".

== Personal life ==
His wife, Elisabeta, graduated from the Cluj Conservatory, and she taught piano to Netanyahu's children. They have two children.
