= Brad (Suciu) =

Tributary in Romania

- Location within Romania

Location
- Country: Romania
- Counties: Maramureș County

Physical characteristics
- Source: Mount Hudieșu
  - location: Țibleș Mountains
  - coordinates: 47°33′18″N 24°10′41″E
  - elevation: 1,350 m (4,430 ft)
- Mouth: Suciu
  - location: Upstream of Groșii Țibleșului
  - coordinates: 47°30′08″N 24°04′22″E
  - elevation: 507 m (1,663 ft)
- Length: 12 km (7.5 mi)
- Basin size: 63 km^{2} (24 sq mi)

Basin features
- Progression: Suciu→ Lăpuș→ Someș→ Tisza→ Danube→ Black Sea
- Tributaries
  - left: Țibleș
  - right: Valea Mare

The Brad is a left tributary of the river Suciu in Romania. It flows into the Suciu near Groșii Țibleșului. Its length is 12 km (7.5 mi) and its basin size is 63 km^{2} (24 sq mi).
