= Remus Ludu =

Romanian gymnast (1914–1982)

- Born: 3 May 1914 Târgu Lăpuș, Austria-Hungary
- Died: 1982 (aged 67–68)

Gymnastics career
- Discipline: Men's artistic gymnastics
- Country represented: Romania

Remus Ludu (13 May 1914 – 1982) was a Romanian gymnast. He competed in eight events at the 1936 Summer Olympics.
