= Union Monument, Târgu Lăpuș =

Union Monument
- Monumentul Eroilor căzuți pentru Unirea tuturor românilor
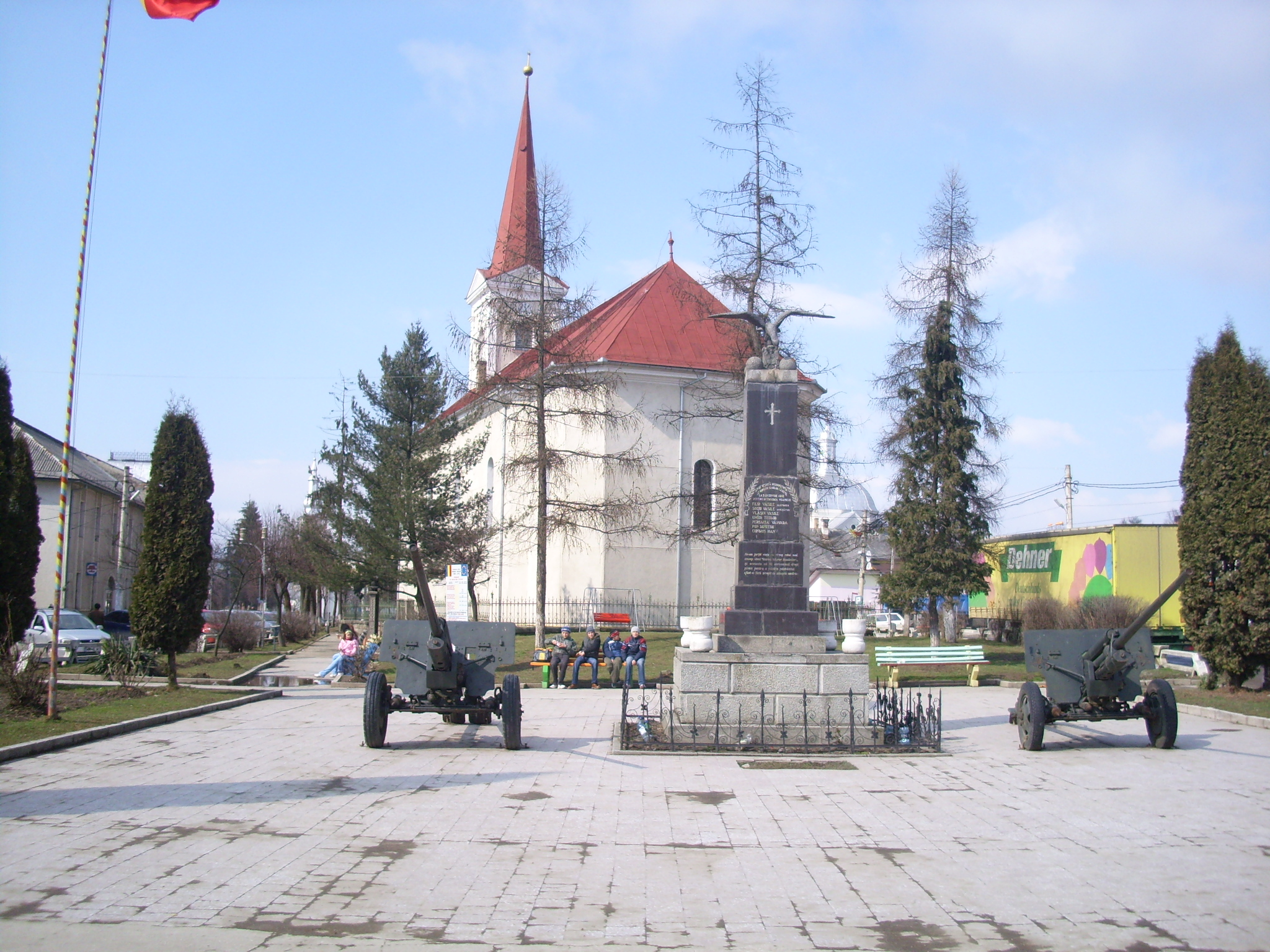
- The Union Monument and the Reformed Church
- Interactive map of Union Monument
- Location: Târgu Lăpuș; Romania
- Coordinates: 47°27′9.41″N 23°51′57.97″E
- Material: stone, bronze
- Completion date: 1935
- Opening date: May 22, 1936
- Dedicated to: Union of Transylvania with Romania

The Union Monument (Romanian: Monumentul Eroilor căzuți pentru Unirea tuturor românilor) is an obelisk in Târgu Lăpuș, Romania. The historic monument (MM-III-m-B-04815) was built in 1935.

The monument commemorates those who died in 1918 for the Union of Transylvania with Romania. It was unveiled on May 22, 1936, in the presence of Constantin Brătianu and Valeriu Roman. On the pedestal were engraved the names of those who perished during the massacre of December 5, 2018. That day, 60 Hungarian soldiers, based in Strâmbu-Băiuț, opened fire on the crowd gathered in the schoolyard in the town center to listen to the proclamation of the Great National Assembly on December 1, 1918; 21 people were killed and 82 were wounded.

In September 1940, after Hungary occupied Northern Transylvania in the wake of the Second Vienna Award, the Union Monument was destroyed. In 1946, after Romania regained control of Northern Transylvania at the end of World War II, the monument was rebuilt, only to be torn down in 1949 by the Communist authorities.

The monument was rebuilt in 1968, and placed in its current location, in a park behind the Reformed Church. (The original monument had been located in front of the former Greek-Catholic Church, now Orthodox Church, since 1948). The monument was renovated in 2018, the year of the centenary anniversary of the Great Union.

== Gallery ==
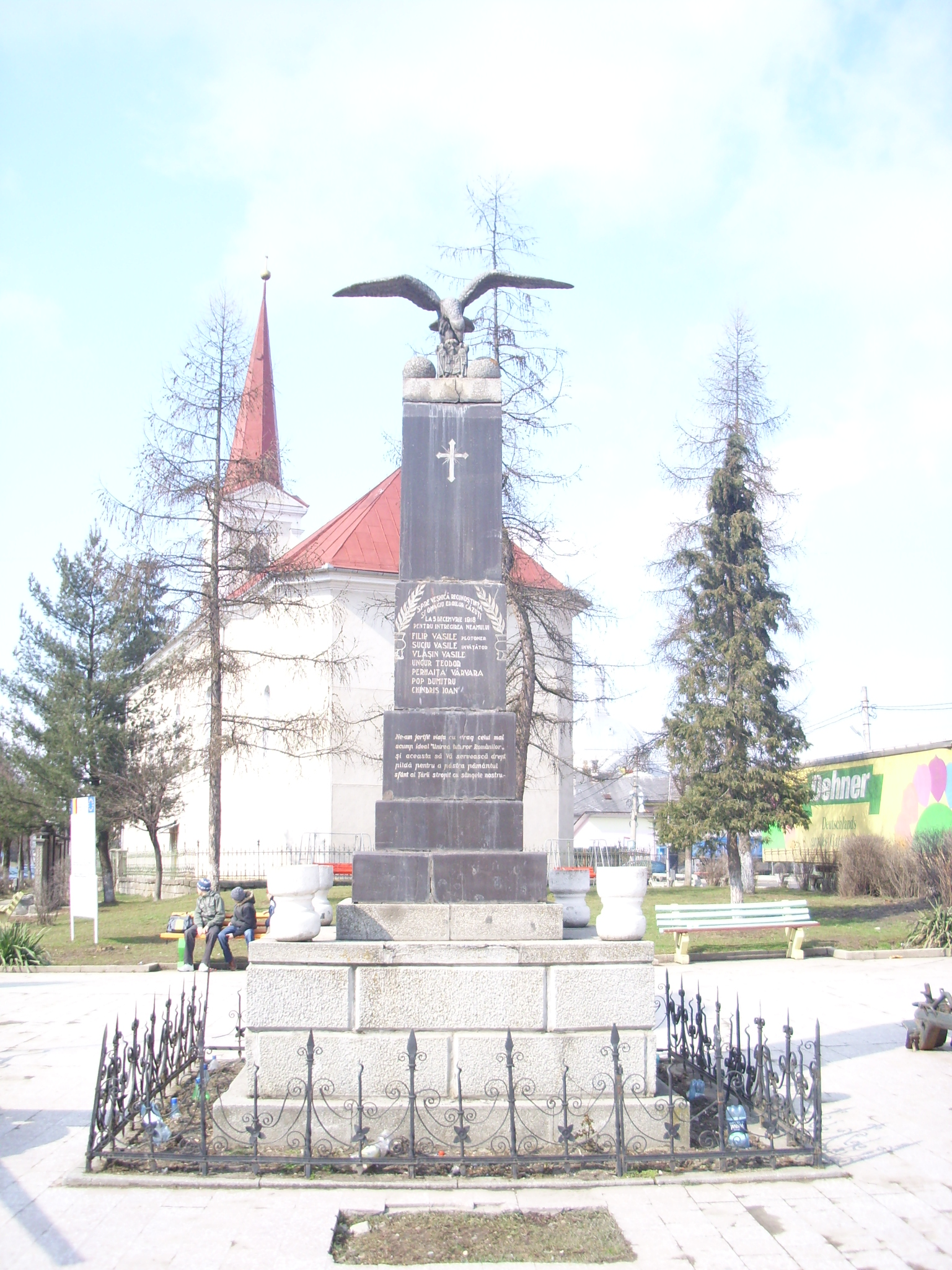
The Union Monument and the Reformed Church
