= Periac =

- Location within Romania

Location
- Country: Romania
- Counties: Maramureș County
- Villages: Suciu de Sus

Physical characteristics
- Source: Lăpuș Mountains
  - coordinates: 47°22′10″N 24°00′51″E
  - elevation: 724 m (2,375 ft)
- Mouth: Suciu
  - location: Suciu de Sus
  - coordinates: 47°25′41″N 24°01′41″E
  - elevation: 409 m (1,342 ft)
- Length: 8 km (5.0 mi)
- Basin size: 29 km^{2} (11 sq mi)

Basin features
- Progression: Suciu→ Lăpuș→ Someș→ Tisza→ Danube→ Black Sea
- Tributaries
  - right: Șerpoaia

The Periac is a left tributary of the river Suciu in Romania. It flows into the Suciu in Suciu de Sus. Its length is 8 km (5.0 mi) and its basin size is 29 km^{2} (11 sq mi).
