= Rohia Monastery =

Romanian Orthodox monastery in Rohia, Romania

Coordinates: 47.4108°N 23.8824°E

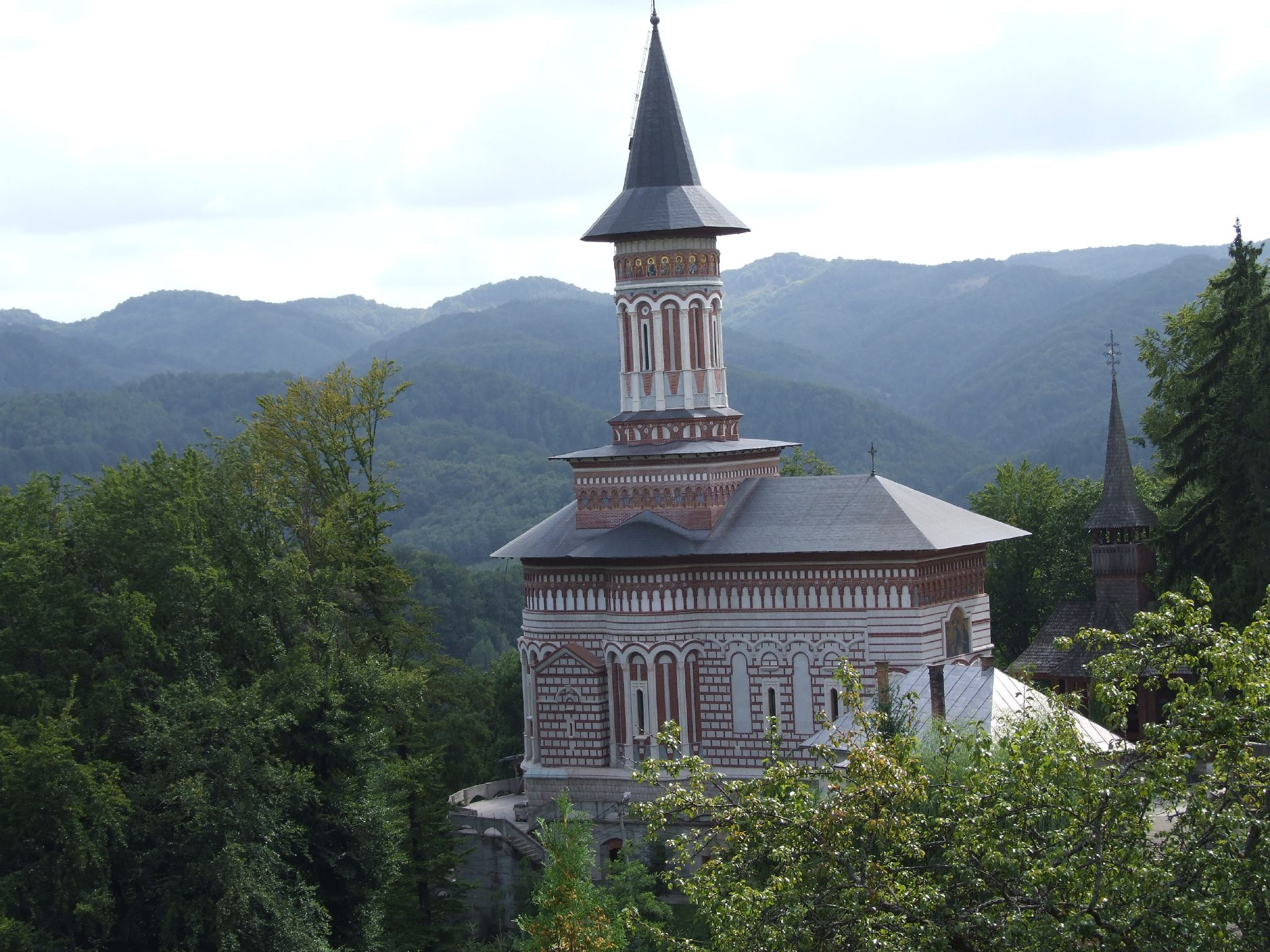
Rohia Monastery

Rohia Monastery (Romanian: Mănăstirea Sfânta Ana Rohia) is a Romanian Orthodox monastery. Named after Saint Anne, it is located in the northwestern part of Romania, in Rohia, a village administered by Târgu Lăpuș town in Maramureș County.

The monastery is situated on a hillside at an altitude of some 500 meters, in the middle of a beech and oak grove. The initiative for founding it came from the priest Nicolae Gherman (1877-1959), whose daughter Ana died in late 1922 at the age of 10. Inspired to start a monastery in her memory, he began work the following year, assisted by hundreds of volunteers. Two years later, a small church and monks' residence were complete. Bishop Nicolae Ivan blessed the monastery in 1926, on the feast of the Dormition of the Mother of God, to which the establishment was dedicated. Thus, it became among the first monasteries built in the region following the union of Transylvania with Romania, but remained a skete for many years due to its inaccessibility. It expanded after 1970, when an access road was finished and electricity introduced.

The monastery is noted as the place where writer Nicolae Steinhardt lived as a monk from 1980 until his death in 1989.
