= Church of the Holy Archangels, Rogoz =

Church in Maramureș County, Romania

Church of the Holy Archangels
- Biserica de lemn Sf. Arhangheli
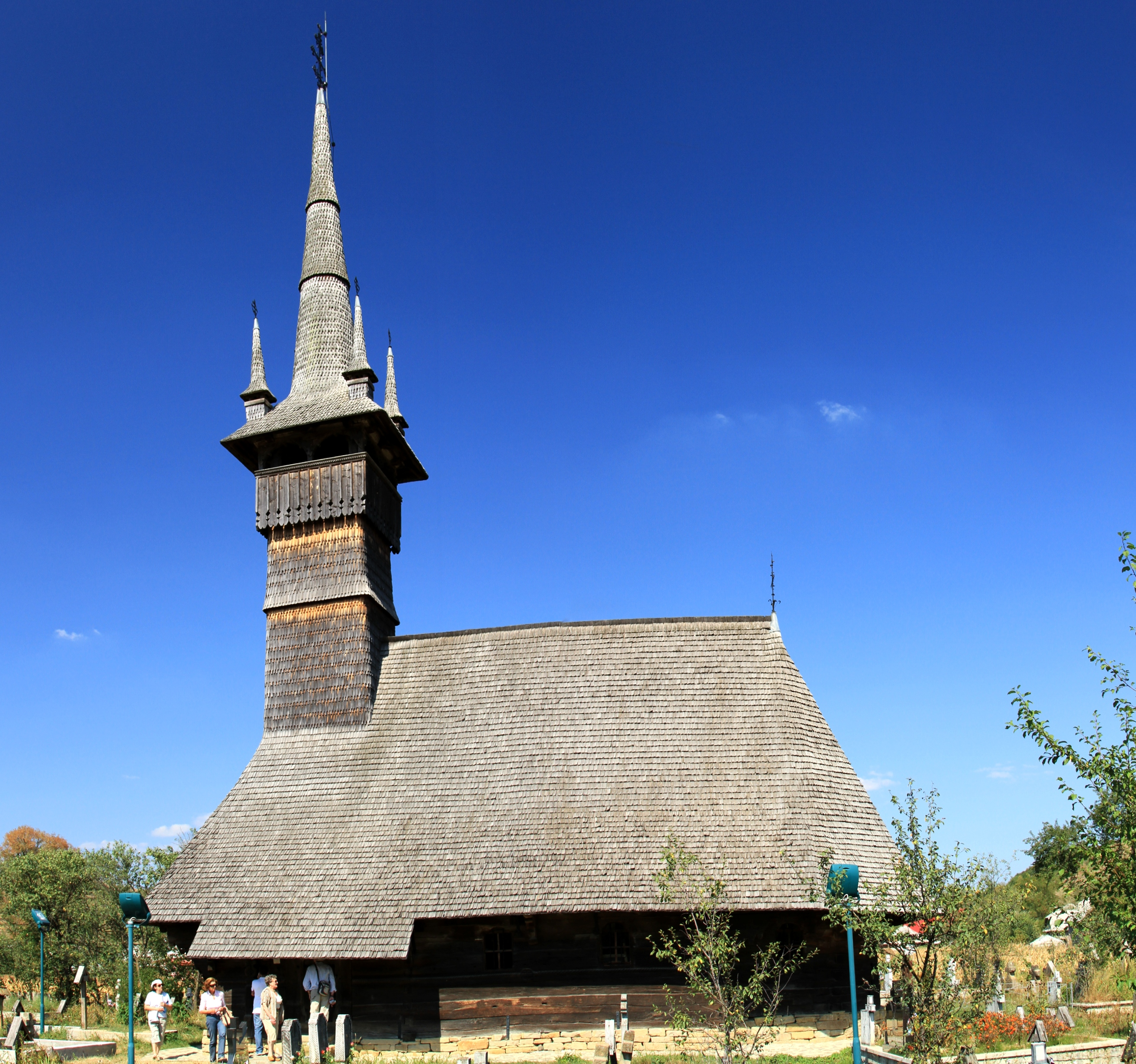
- Church of the Holy Archangels
- Address: Târgu Lăpuș, Maramureș County
- Country: Romania
- Denomination: Eastern Orthodox

History
- Status: active church
- Consecrated: 1633

Administration
- Diocese: Diocese of Maramureș and Sătmar

UNESCO World Heritage Site
- Part of: Wooden Churches of Maramureş
- Criteria: Cultural: (iv)
- Reference: 904
- Inscription: 1999 (23rd Session)

The Church of the Holy Archangels (Romanian: Biserica de lemn Sf. Arhangheli) is one of eight Wooden Churches of Maramureș in Romania listed as a UNESCO World Heritage Site in December 1999. The structure is in the village of Rogoz in the Lăpuș River valley, within the mountainous area of northern Transylvania.

== History ==
The church was built in 1633, which is indirectly confirmed by the inscription at the entrance informing visitors about the Tatar raid in 1661. The church survived the last Tatar invasion of 1717 which is referred to on a mural writing which mentions the terrifying year 1717 of the time of the Tatars. In 1883 it was moved from Suciu de Sus to the centre of the village of Rogoz on the site of St. Paraskeva, an existing church built in 1701. In 1834 the size of the nave windows was increased. In 1960–1961 a major renovation of the structure was undertaken and the floors were renewed.

== Structure ==
The church is a timber structure built of slabs that are jointed together without the use of metal nails. The wooden walls rest on a base of stone blocks and pebbles. The timber is elm and according to tradition all this wood came from two huge trees from the hill of Dealul Popii. The roof is of wooden shingles with very wide eaves that overhang the walls. There is a tower at the western end, the usual position in Maramureș wooden churches. The tower has a spire and four corner pinnacles, all hung with shingles and surrounded by the sweep of the main roof. The nave is narrow and rectangular, extending to a heptagonal chancel at the eastern end. There is also a polygonal porch. The design combines Orthodox traditions with Gothic influences. Both the interior and exterior have carved wooden architectural details including a twisted rope decoration. There are two windows in the nave and the altar has a small circular window through which the sun's rays penetrate for a period of 30 minutes from 1 to 15 August.

== Interior decoration ==
All the interior walls are painted with murals in bright colours by Nicholas Mann and Radu Munteanu from the village of Ungureni who also produced wall paintings for the church in Desești and others in the Lăpuș area. The murals date from 1785 as documented in inscriptions in Cyrillic. The scenes represented are not coherent as some are missing and some are fragmented. In 1834 the ceiling and nave were repainted by an unidentified artist.

== Exterior gallery ==
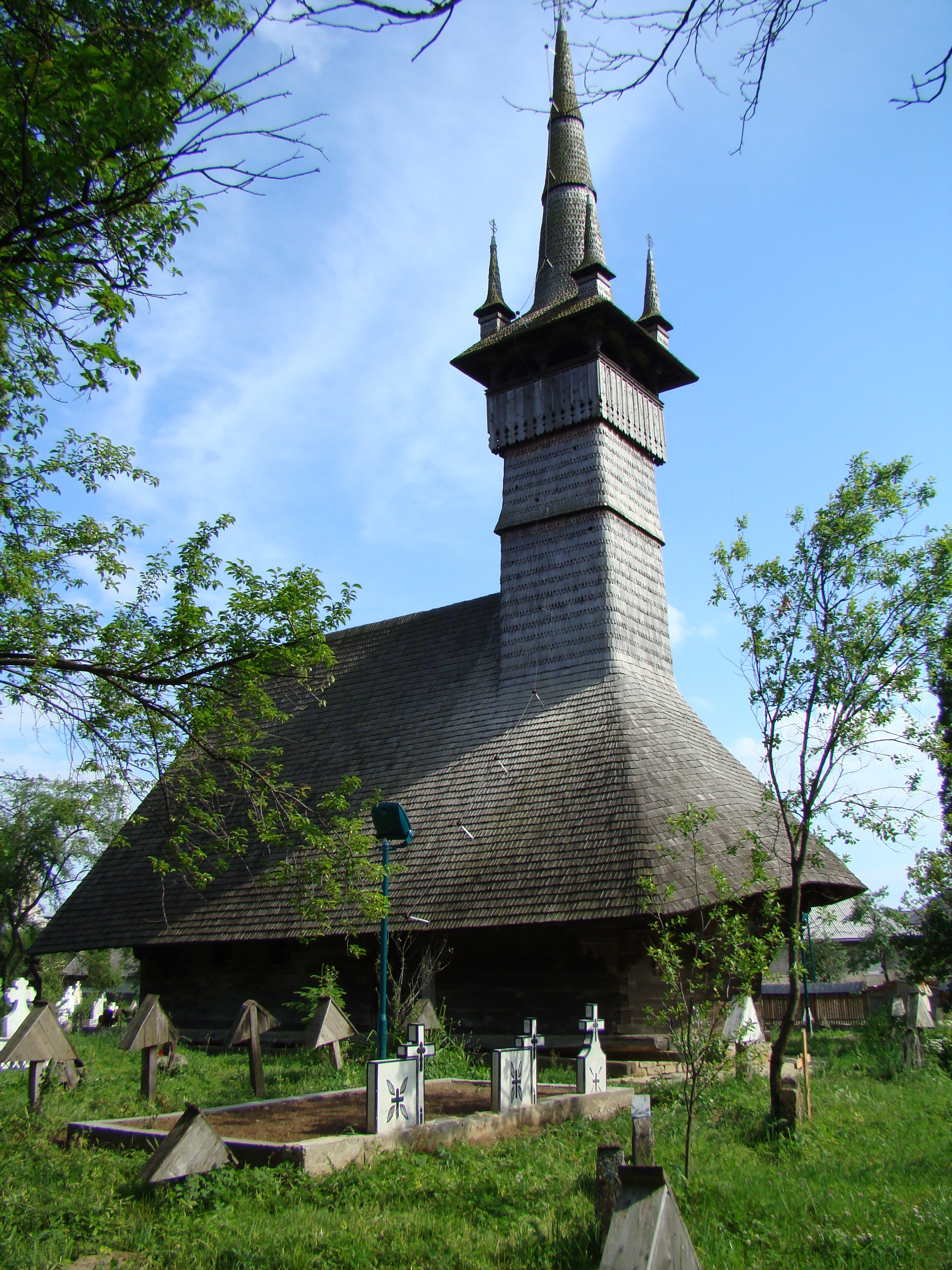
The church is set in a graveyard

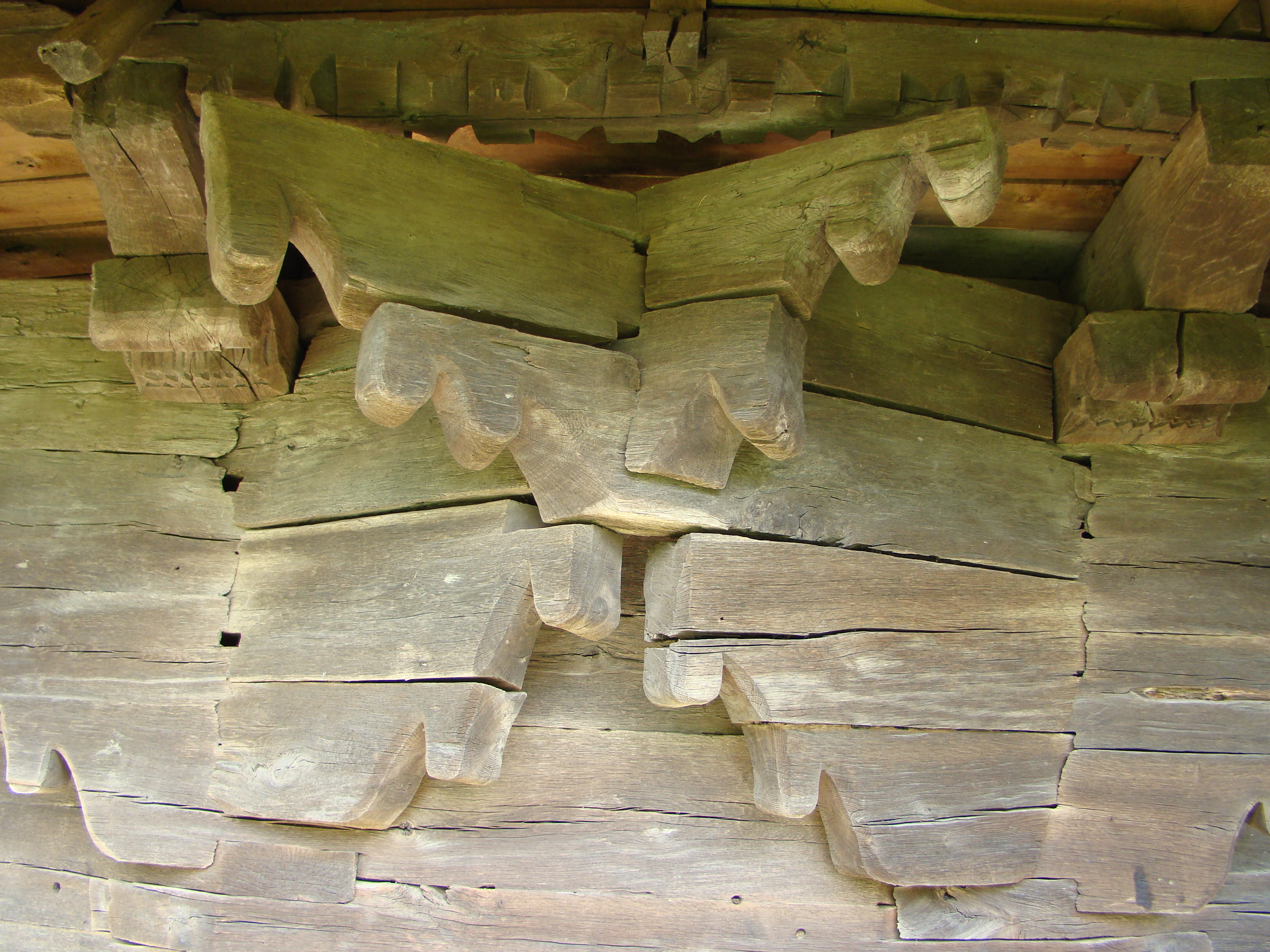
Detail showing the method of jointing with 'horses heads'

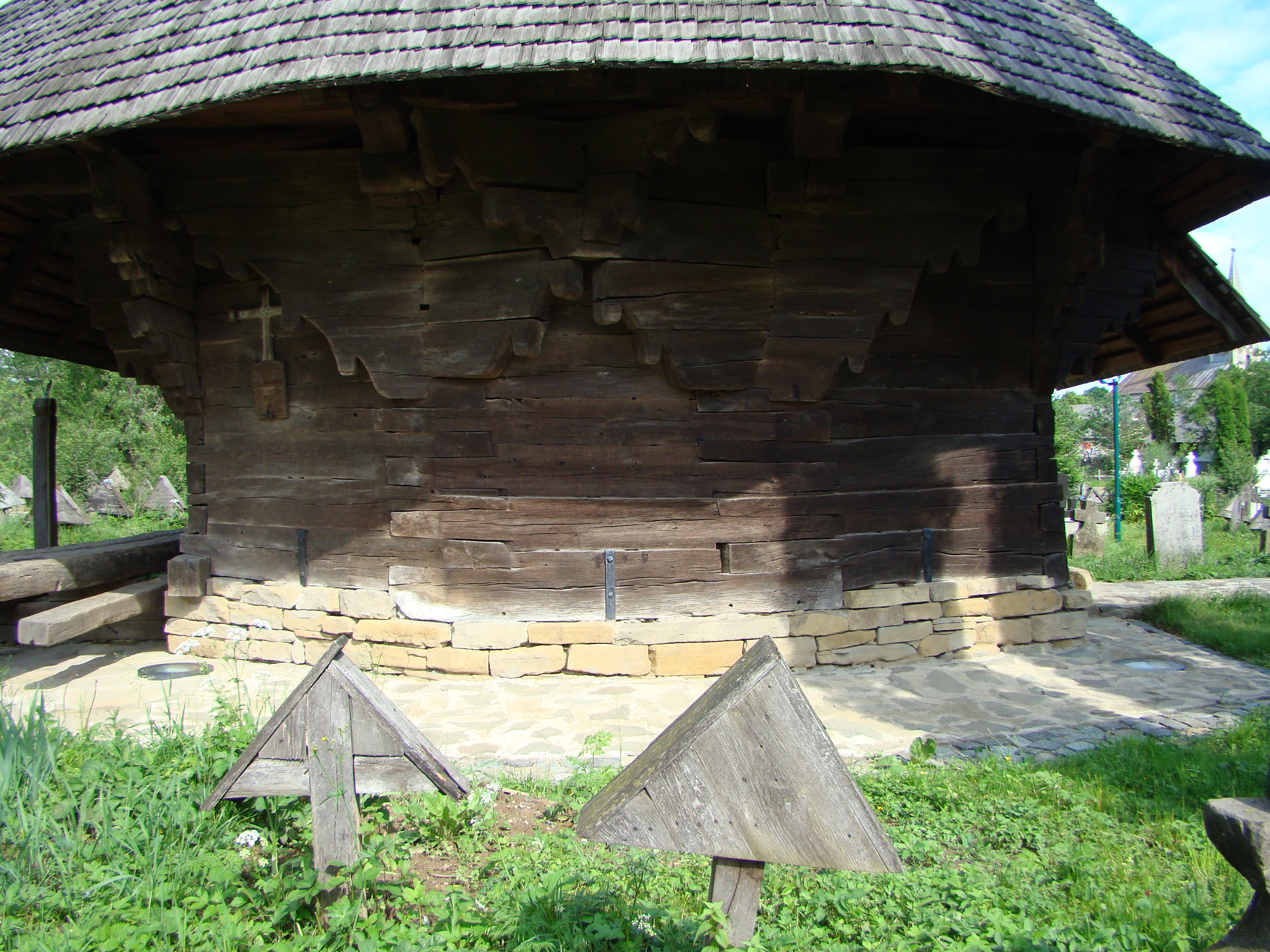
Detail showing polygonal apse and stone base

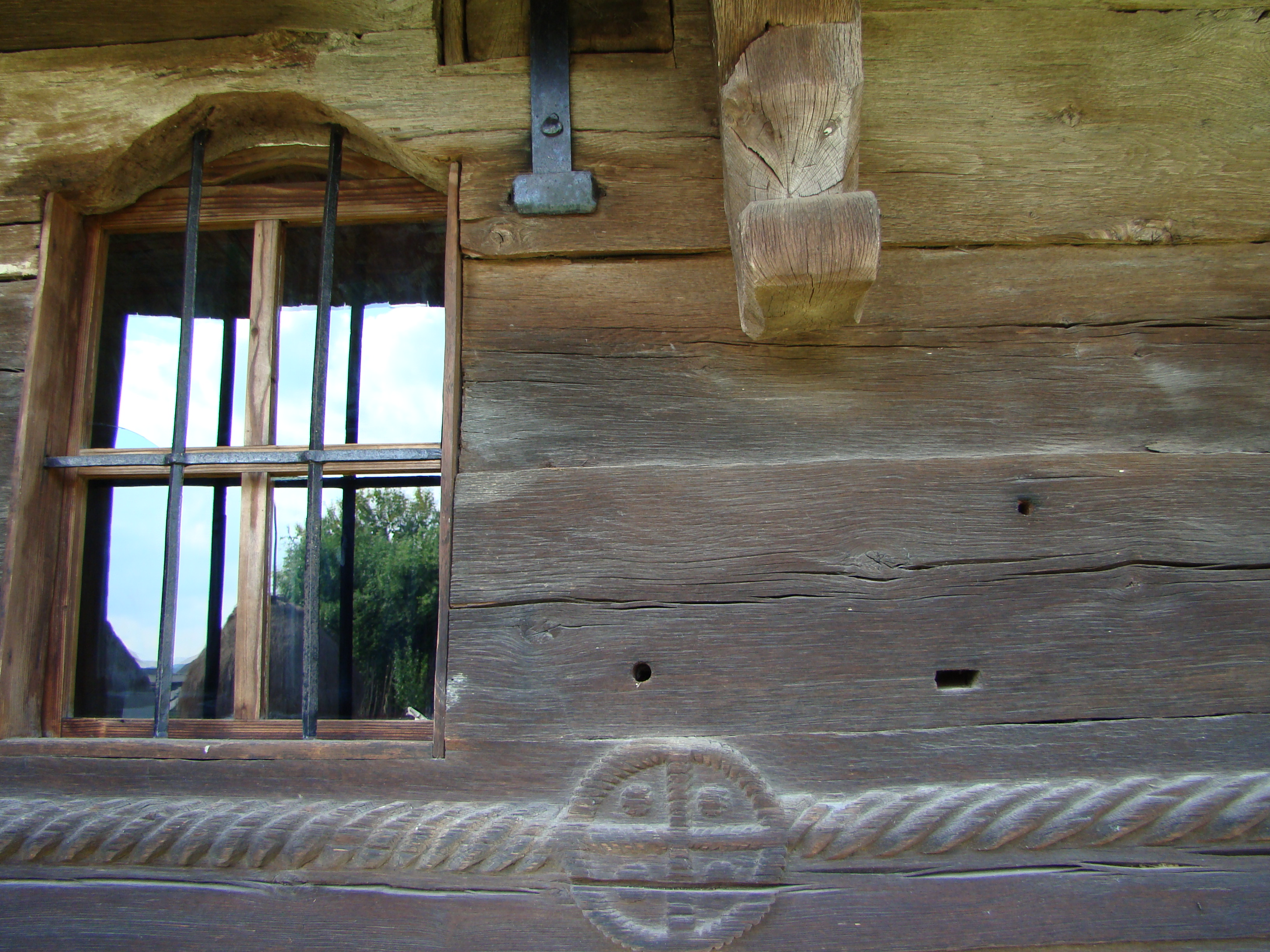
The exterior is decorated with carved cables and crosses

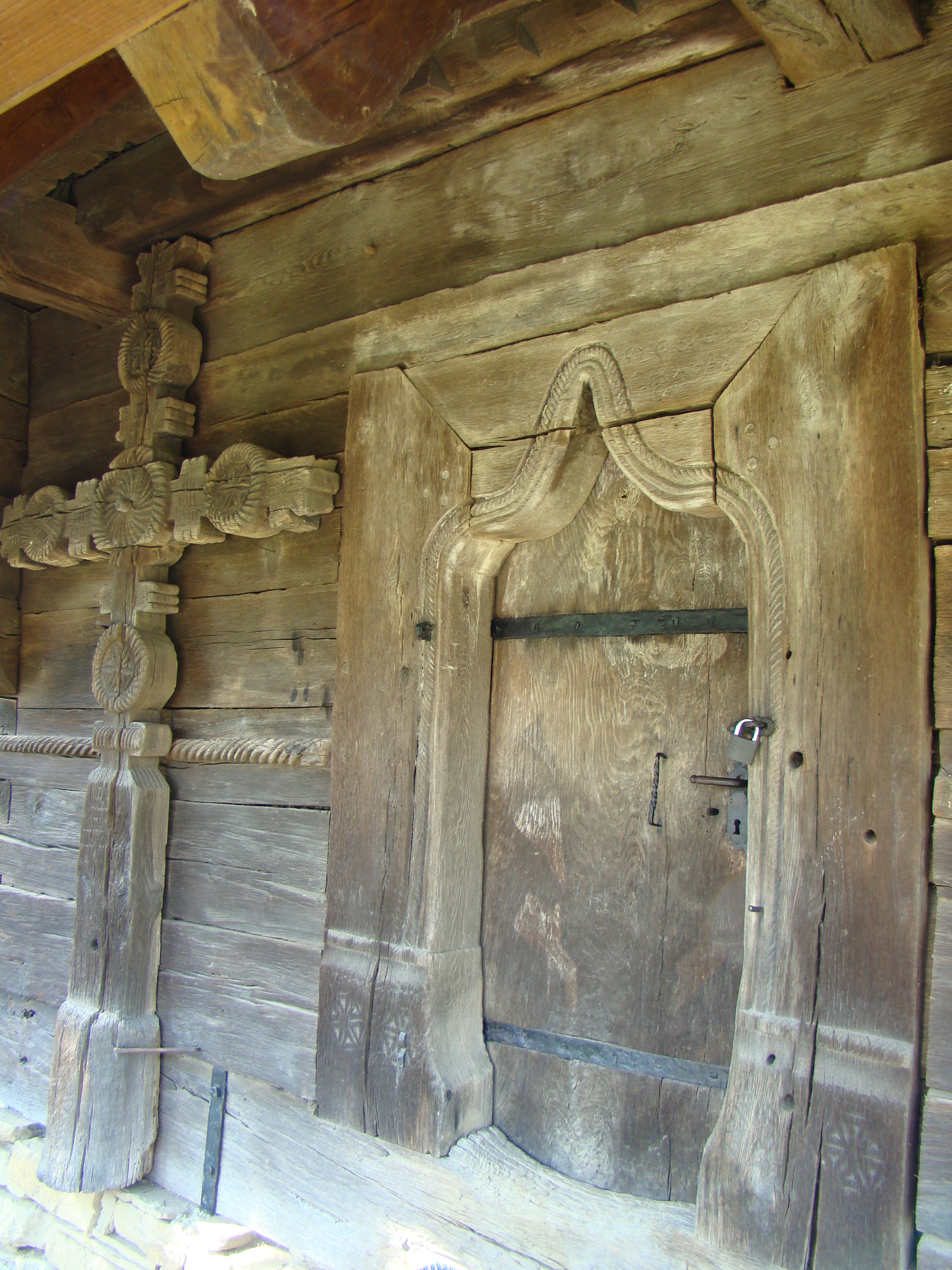
An inscription on the door remembers the Tatar invasion of 1661

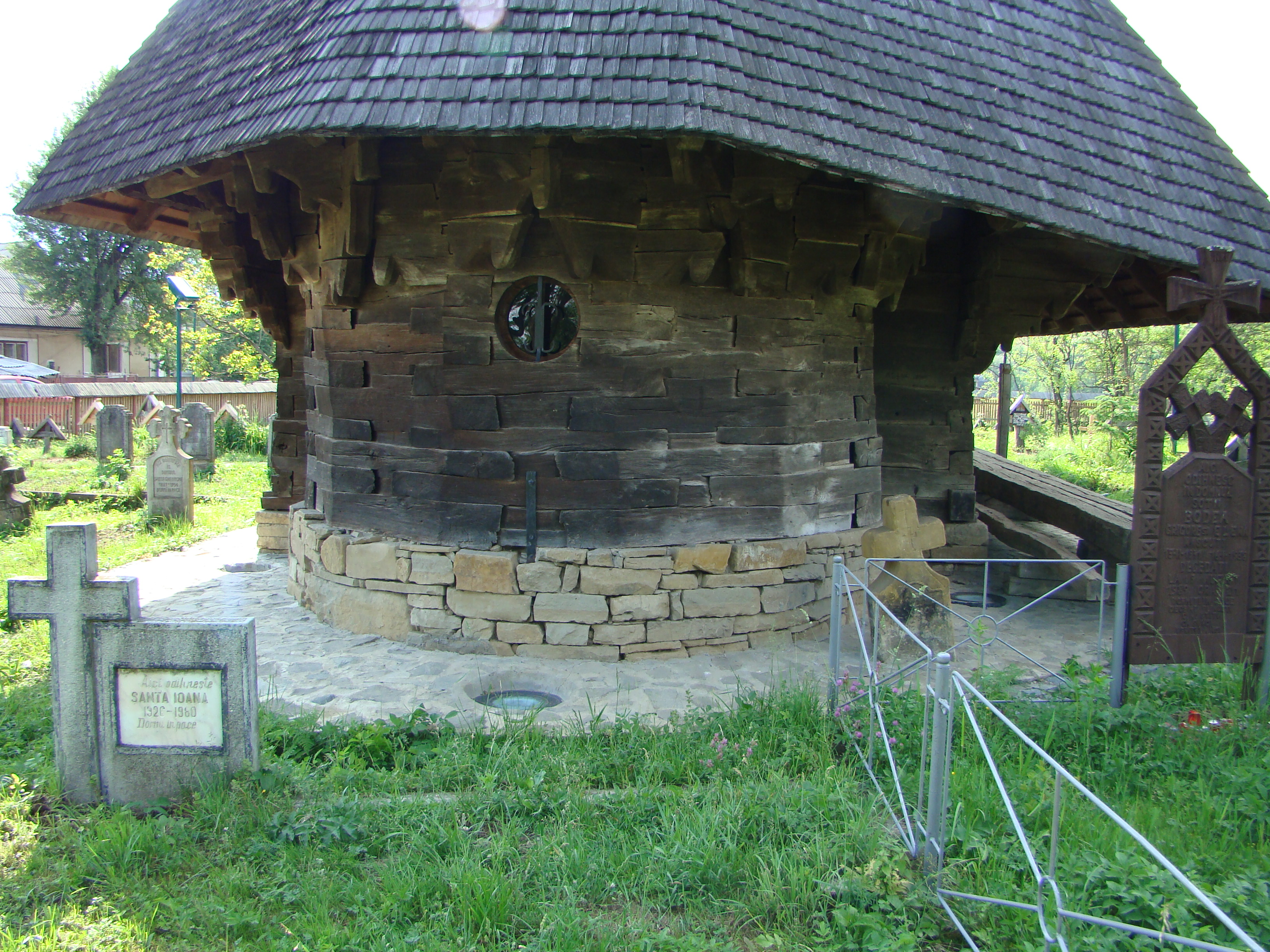
An unusual round window at the apse of the church

== Interior gallery ==
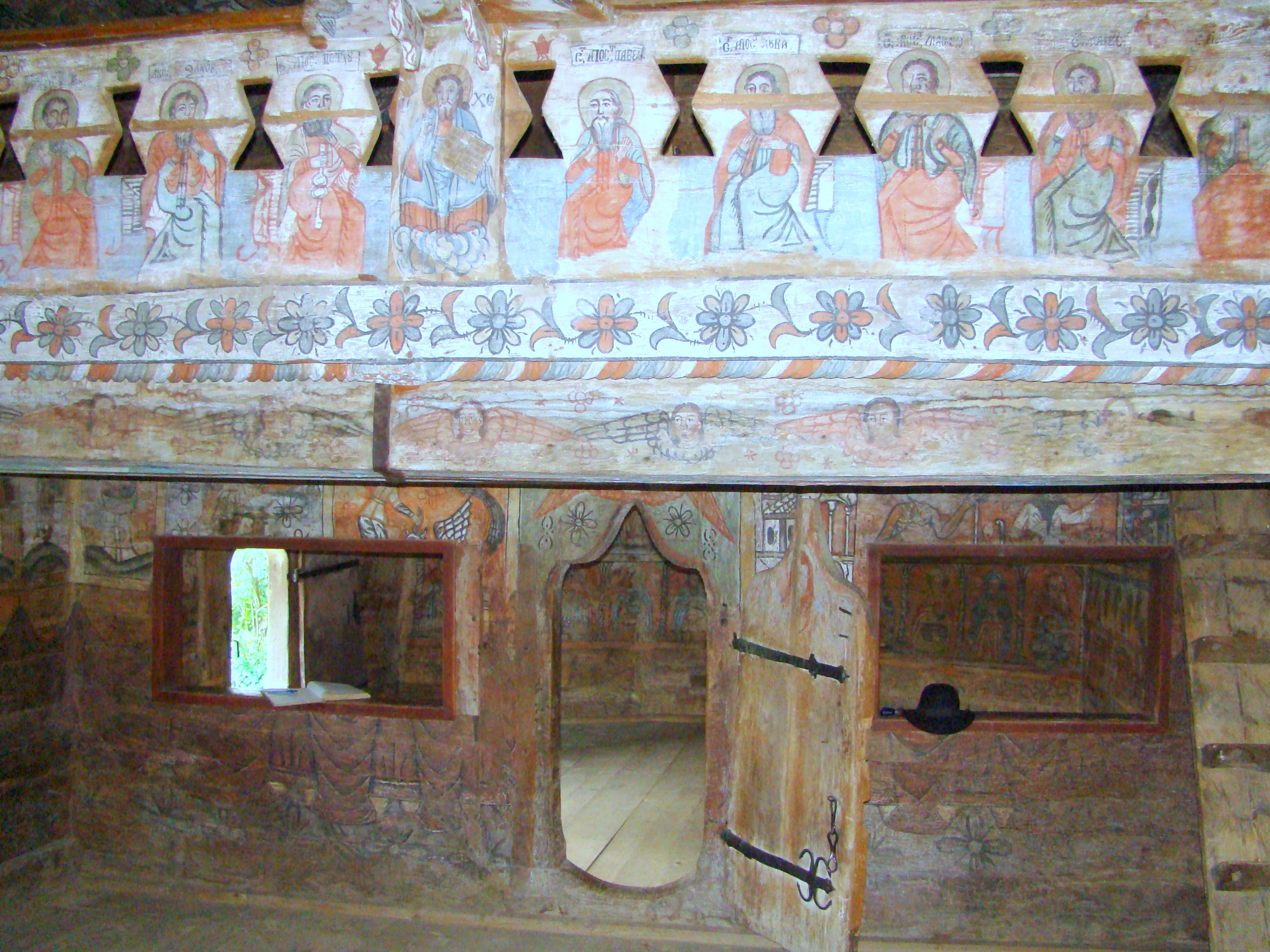

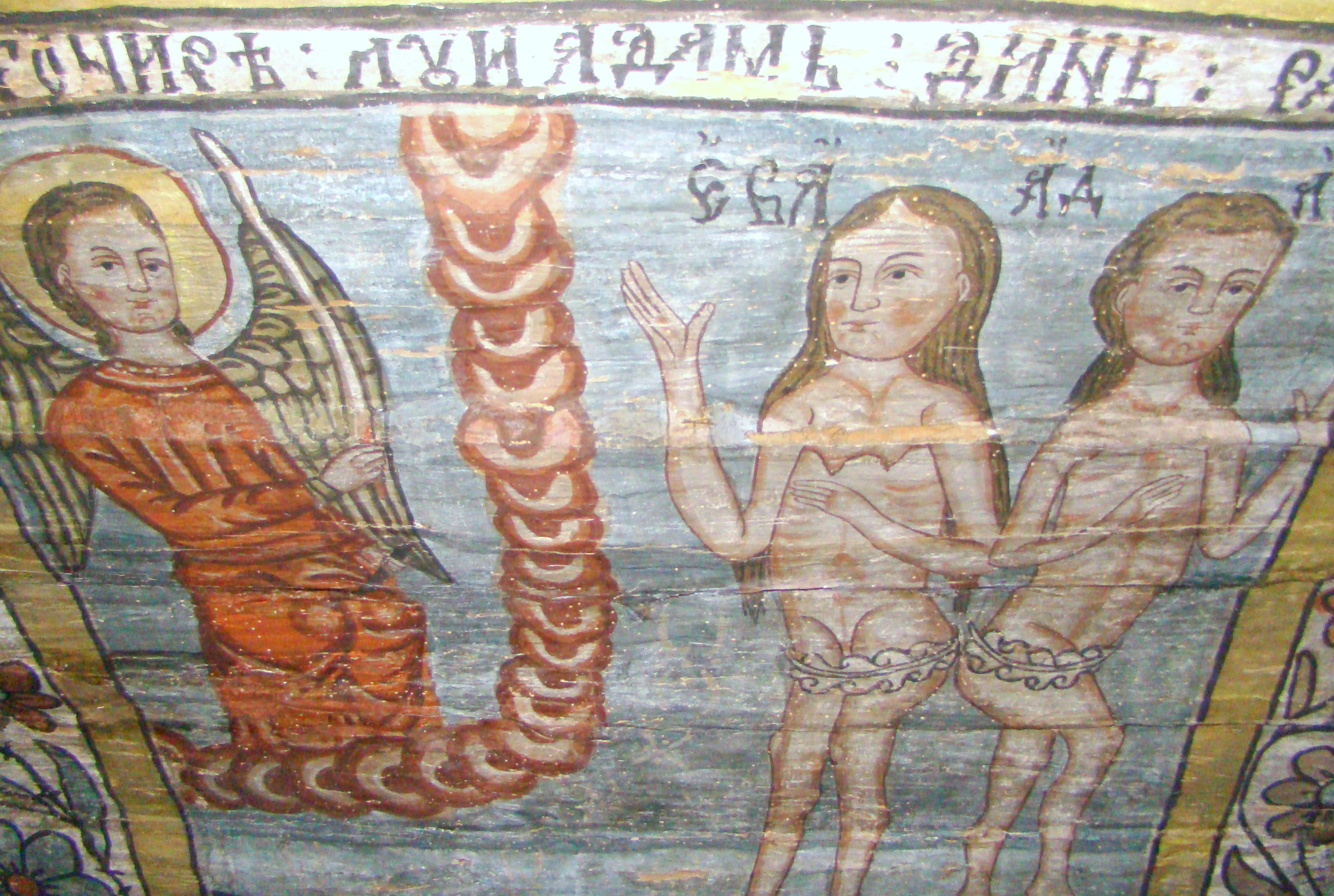

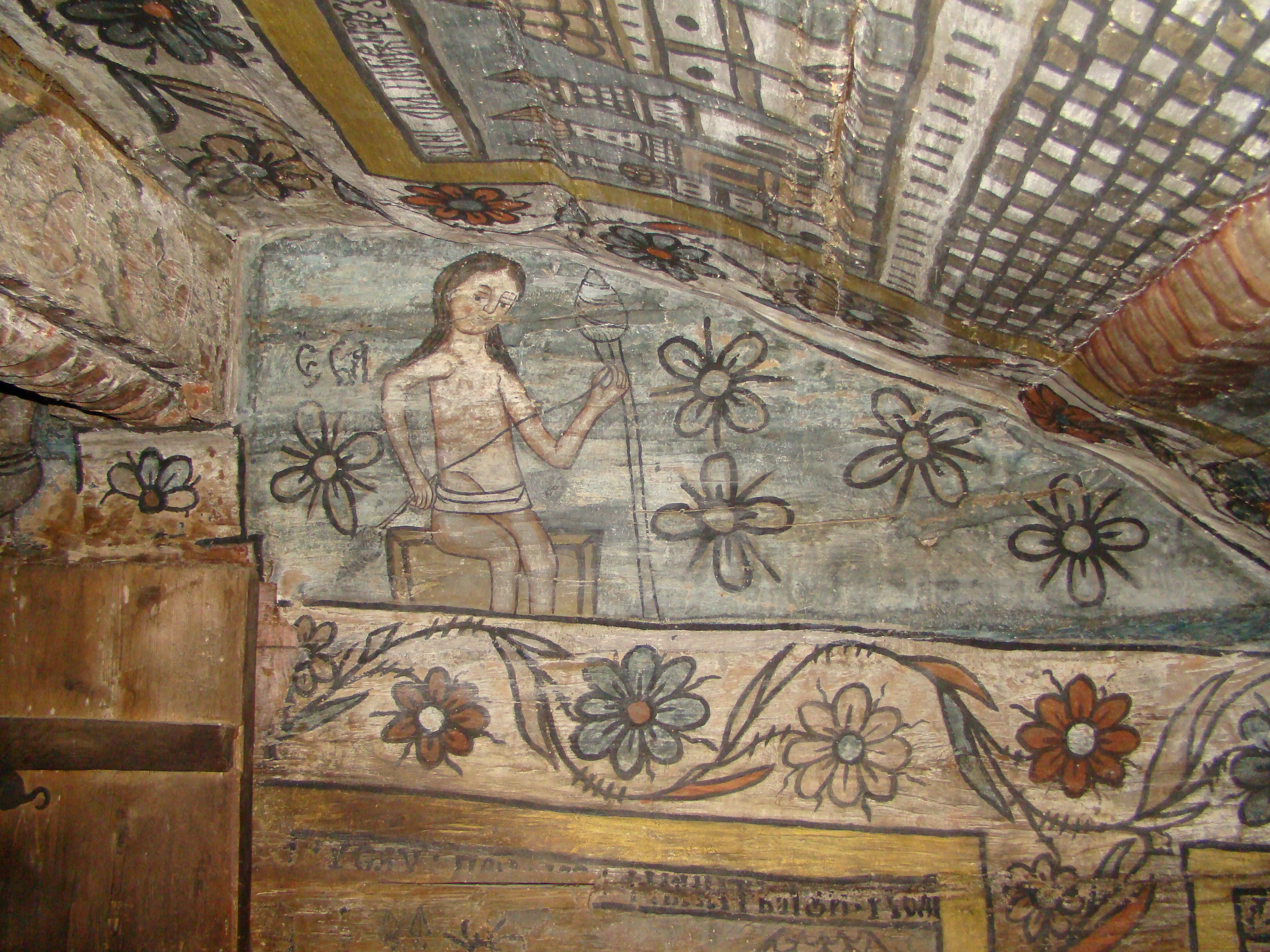

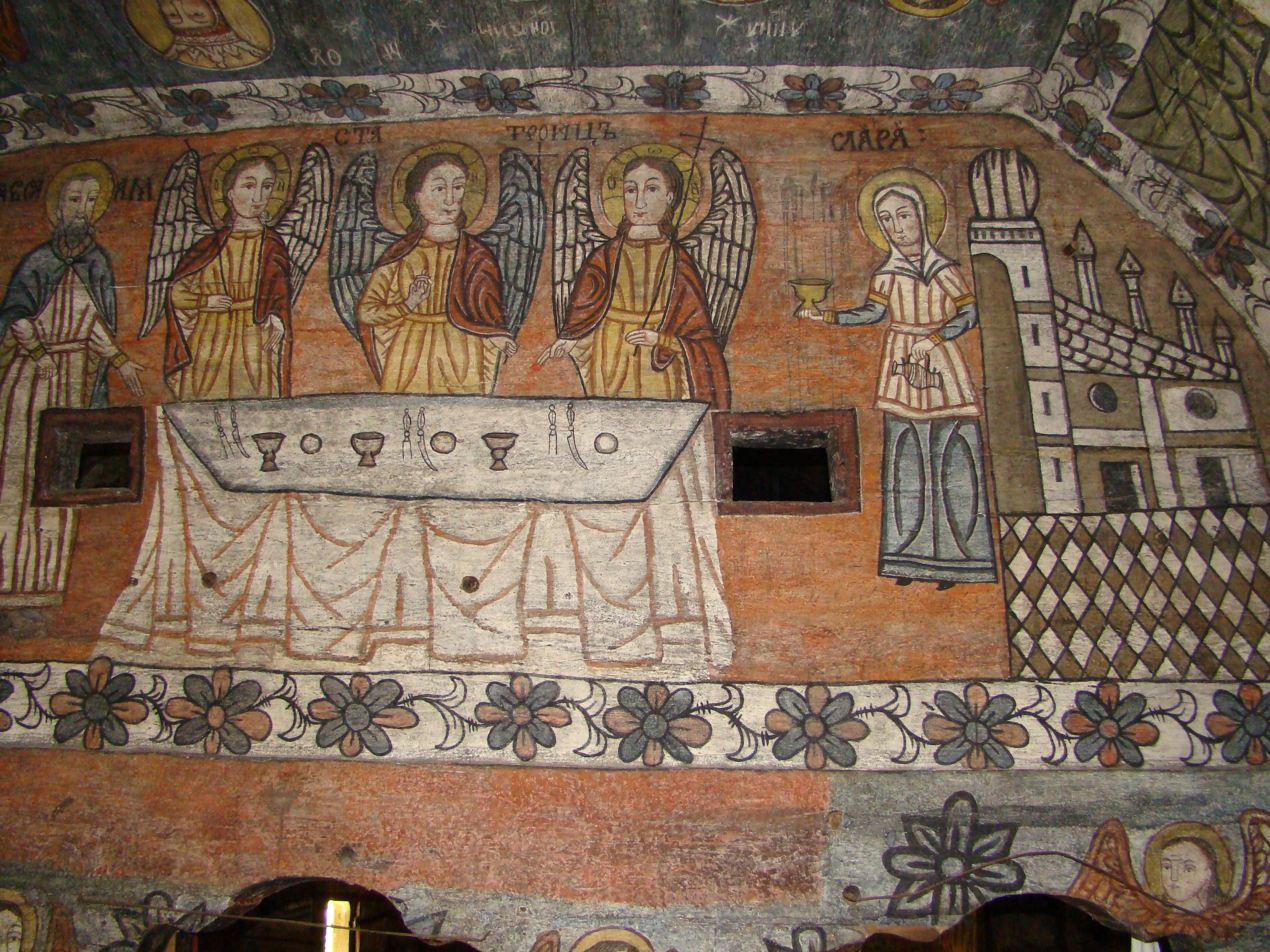

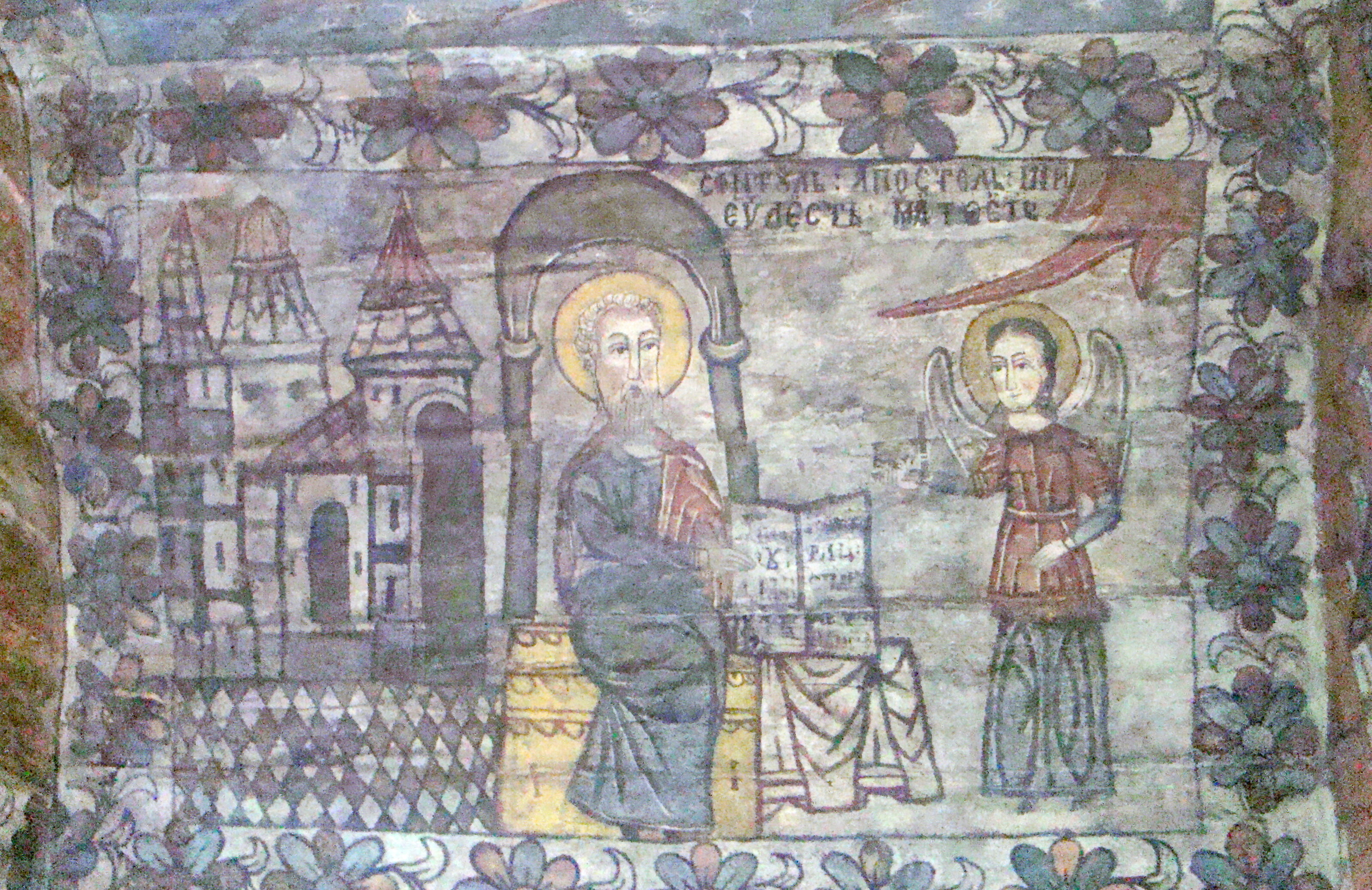

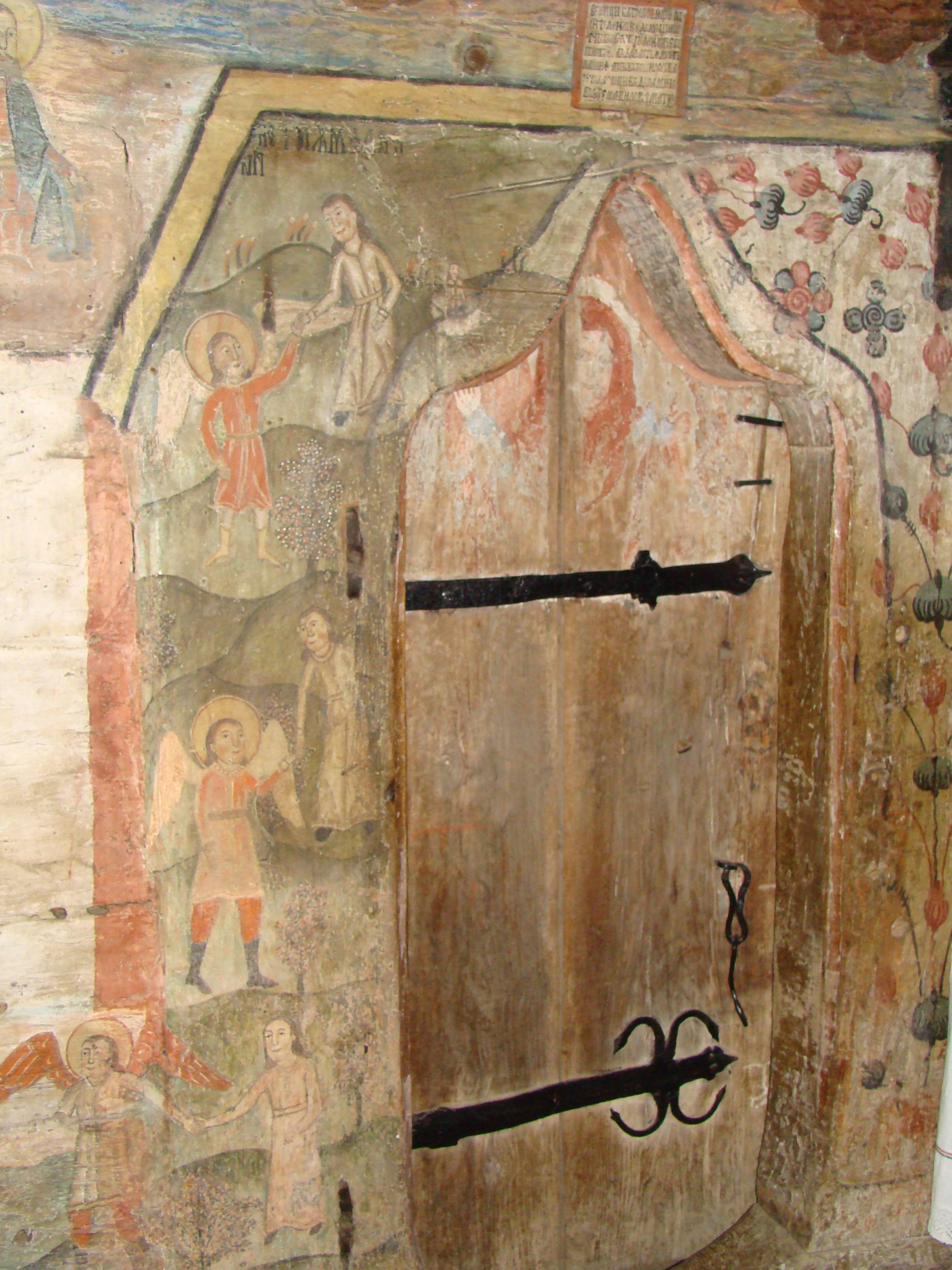

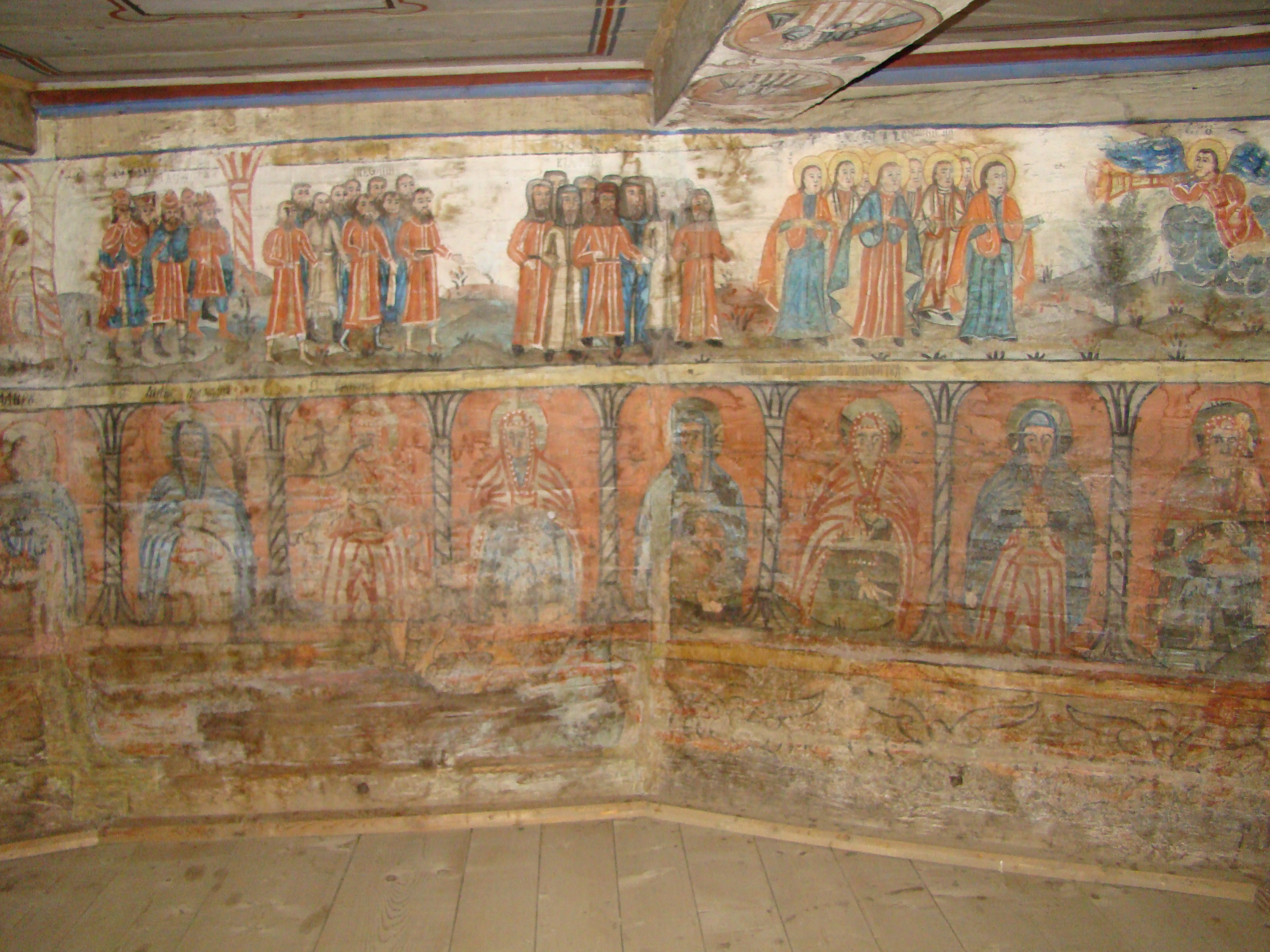

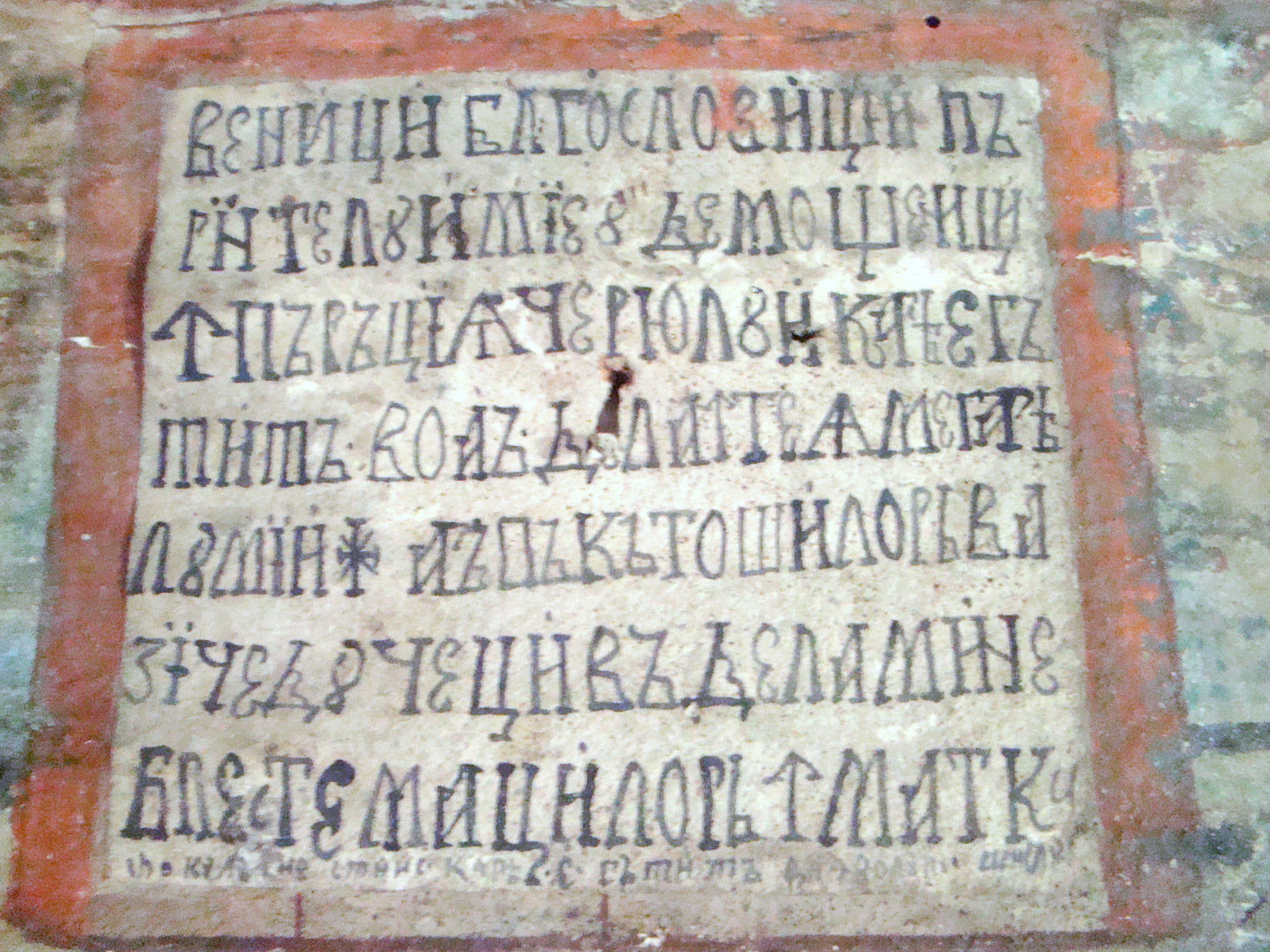

== See also ==
- List of World Heritage Sites in Romania
- Vernacular architecture of the Carpathians
- Wooden churches of Maramureș
