= Zîmbreni =

- Commune
- Location within Moldova
- Coordinates: 46.8333333333°N 28.85°E
- Country: Moldova
- District: Ialoveni District

Population (2014)
  - Total: 2,588
- Time zone: UTC+2 (EET)
  - Summer (DST): UTC+3 (EEST)

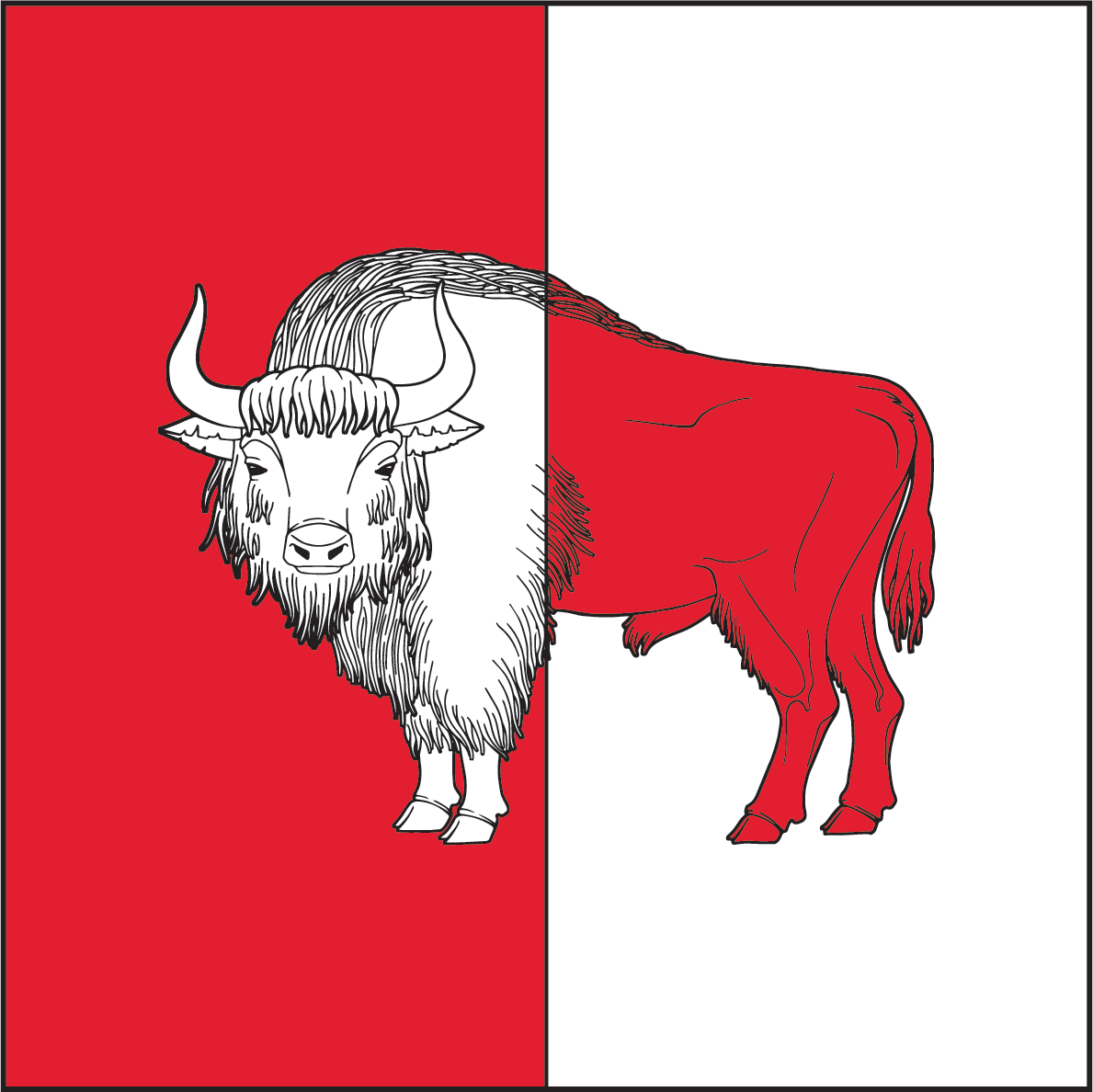
Flag of Zîmbreni Commune

Zîmbreni is a commune in Ialoveni District, Moldova. It is composed of two villages, Găureni and Zîmbreni.
