= Suciu de Sus =

- Commune
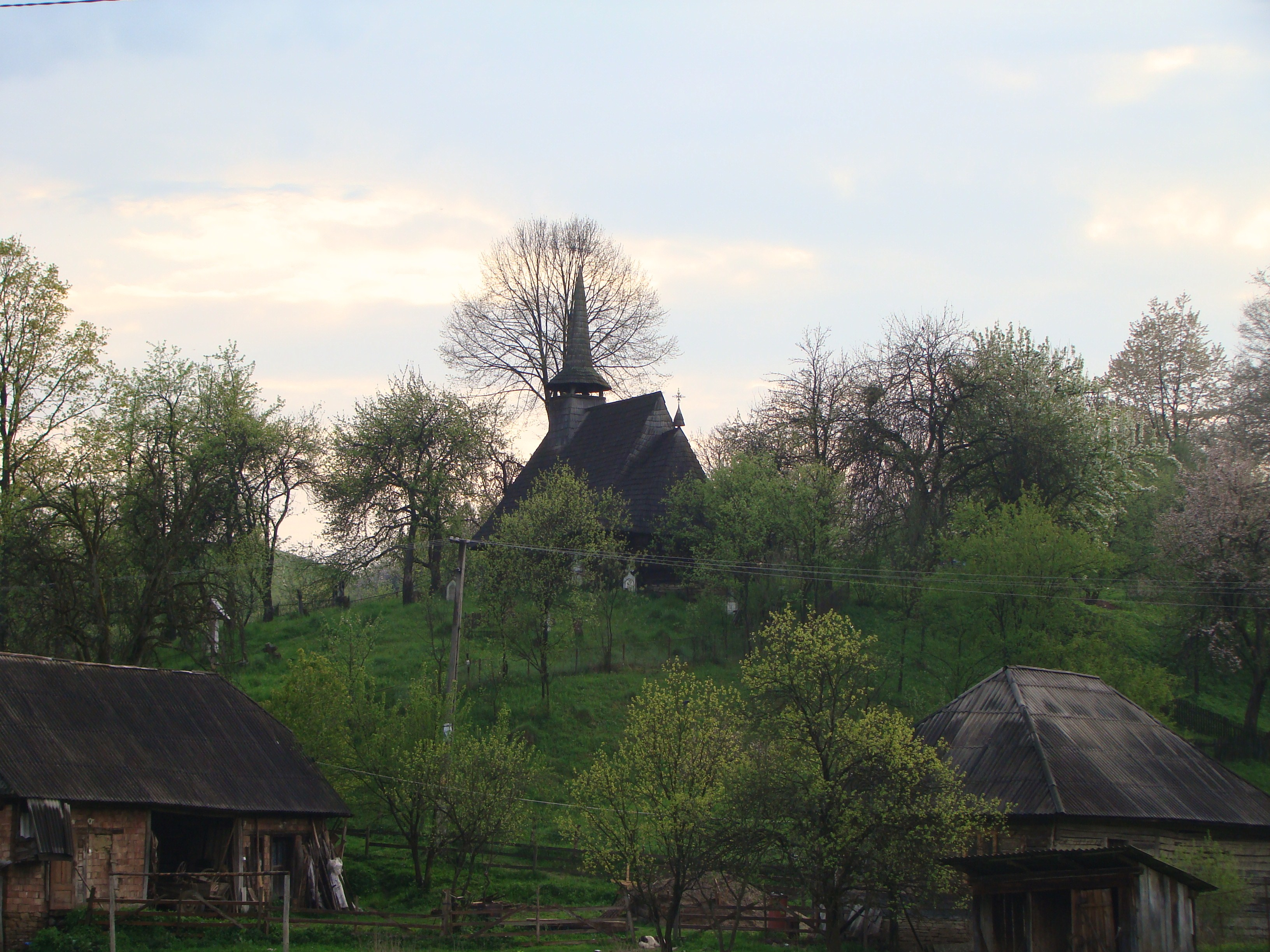
- Larga

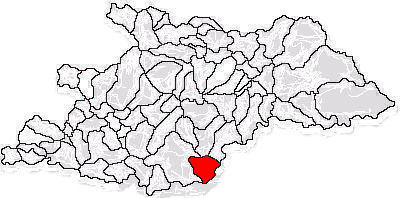
- Location in Maramureș County

- Location in Romania
- Coordinates: 47°26′N 24°2′E
- Country: Romania
- County: Maramureș

Government
  - Mayor (2020–2024): Viorel Pașca (PSD)
- Area: 114.69 km^{2} (44.28 sq mi)
- Elevation: 413 m (1,355 ft)
- Population (2021-12-01): 3,621
  - Density: 31.57/km^{2} (81.77/sq mi)
- Time zone: UTC+02:00 (EET)
  - Summer (DST): UTC+03:00 (EEST)
- Postal code: 437315
- Area code: +40 x59
- Vehicle reg.: MM
- Website: primariasuciudesus.ro

Suciu de Sus (Hungarian: Felsőszőcs) is a commune in Maramureș County, Transylvania, Romania. It is composed of three villages: Larga (Tágfalva), Suciu de Jos (Alsószőcs), and Suciu de Sus.

== Geography ==
The commune lies on the banks of the river Suciu and its left tributary, the Periac. It is located in the southern part of the county, on the border with Bistrița-Năsăud County and near the border with Cluj County. It is situated at a distance of 15 km (9.3 mi) from the town of Târgu Lăpuș and 57 km (35 mi) from Baia Mare, the seat of Maramureș County.

Suciu de Sus is traversed by county road DJ171, which starts in Târgu Lăpuș and leads to Târlișua commune in Bistrița-Năsăud County; the border between the two counties is marked by a 3 m (9.8 ft) tall wayside stone cross, built in 2019.

== Demography ==
Historical population
Year	Pop.	±%
1880	4,065	—
1900	4,889	+20.3%
1910	4,984	+1.9%
1930	5,447	+9.3%
1956	6,406	+17.6%
1977	7,151	+11.6%
1992	6,769	−5.3%
2002	6,222	−8.1%
2011	3,868	−37.8%
2021	3,621	−6.4%
Source: Census data

At the 2011 census, the commune had 3,868 residents; of those, 91.13% were Romanians and 4.52% Roma; 89.3% were Romanian Orthodox, 4.34% Greek-Catholic, and 1.94% Pentecostal. At the 2021 census, Suciu de Sus had a population of 3,621, of which 92.07% were Romanians and 1.85% Roma.

== Churches ==
The Church of the Holy Archangels, one of eight Wooden churches of Maramureș listed as a UNESCO World Heritage Site, was built in Suciu de Sus in 1633 and was moved to the nearby village of Rogoz in 1883.
