= Târgu Lăpuș =

- Town
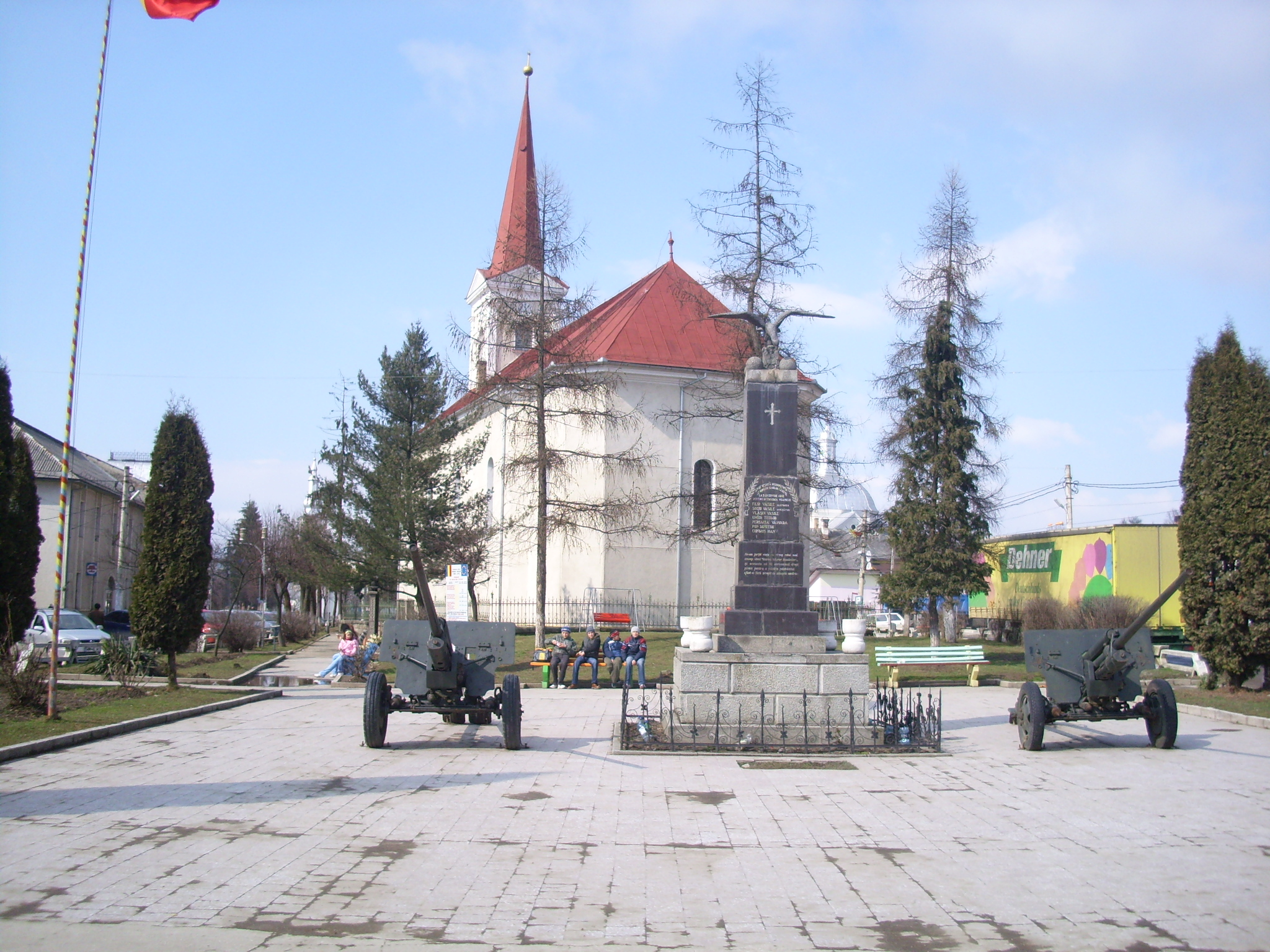
- Union Monument (1935) and Reformed Church (1863)

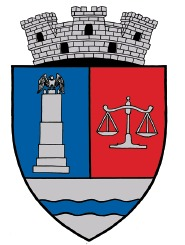
- Coat of arms

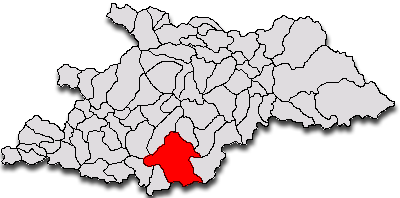
- Location in Maramureș County

- Location in Romania
- Coordinates: 47°27′9″N 23°51′47″E
- Country: Romania
- County: Maramureș

Government
  - Mayor (2024–2028): Andrei-Vlad Herman (PNL)
- Area: 247.35 km^{2} (95.50 sq mi)
- Elevation: 334 m (1,096 ft)
- Population (2021-12-01): 11,163
  - Density: 45.130/km^{2} (116.89/sq mi)
- Time zone: UTC+02:00 (EET)
  - Summer (DST): UTC+03:00 (EEST)
- Postal code: 435600
- Area code: (+40) 02 62
- Vehicle reg.: MM
- Website: primariatargulapus.ro

Târgu Lăpuș (Romanian pronunciation: [ˌtɨrɡu ləˈpuʃ]; Hungarian: Magyarlápos, Yiddish: מאדיאר-לאפאש, romanized: Madjar Laposh, German: Laposch) is a town in Maramureș County, northern Transylvania, Romania. It administers thirteen villages: Boiereni (Boérfalva), Borcut (Borkút), Cufoaia (Kohópatak), Dămăcușeni (Domokos), Dobricu Lăpușului (Láposdebrek), Dumbrava (Kisdebrecen), Fântânele (until 1960 Poiana Porcului; Lápospataka), Groape (Groppa), Inău (Ünőmező), Răzoare (Macskamező), Rogoz (Rogoz), Rohia (Rohi), and Stoiceni (Sztojkafalva).

== Geography ==
The town is situated at the northwestern edge of the Transylvanian Plateau, at the foot of the Lăpuș Mountains. It lies on the banks of the river Lăpuș and of its tributary, the river Suciu, which flows into the Lăpuș in Dămăcușeni village. The 36-kilometre-long (22 mi) Lăpuș Gorge is a protected area on the western side of the town, between the villages of Răzoare and Remecioara. Lighet Lake is a reservoir in the southeastern part of the town; with a surface area of 4 hectares (10 acres), it is stocked with common, crucian, and grass carp, Alburnus, rudd, and perch.

Târgu Lăpuș is located in the southern part of Maramureș County, on the border with Cluj and Sălaj counties. It is the center of the Țara Lăpușului ethnographic region. The town is crossed by national road DN18B, which runs from the county seat, Baia Mare, 43 km (27 mi) to the northwest, to Cășeiu commune (near Dej), 40 km (25 mi) to the south.

== Sights ==
The Church of the Holy Archangels in Rogoz village is one of eight Wooden Churches of Maramureș listed by UNESCO as a World Heritage Site. Among the town's historic buildings are also the Roman Catholic church (1752), the Calvinist church (1839), the Orthodox church (1906–1912), the old school (1858), and the old town hall, now a dispensary (19th century). Rohia Monastery is also located within the town limits.

The Union Monument is an obelisk located behind the Reformed Church. The monument commemorates the 21 inhabitants of Târgu Lăpuș who were massacred by Hungarian troops in December 1918 while celebrating the Union of Transylvania with Romania.

== Demographics ==
At the 2021 census, Târgu Lăpuș had a population of 11,163; of these, 77.8% were Romanians, 9.5% Hungarians, and 1% Roma. At the 2011 census, the town had a population of 11,744, of which 86.5% were Romanians, 12.4% Hungarians, and 1% Roma; 74.5% belonged to the Romanian Orthodox Church, 10.1% to the Reformed Church, 7.3% were Pentecostal, 4% Greek-Catholic, and 2.7% Roman Catholic.

Historical population
Year	Pop.	±%
1880	9,093	—
1900	10,526	+15.8%
1910	11,074	+5.2%
1930	10,312	−6.9%
1956	11,780	+14.2%
1966	12,361	+4.9%
1970	12,929	+4.6%
1977	13,218	+2.2%
1992	14,303	+8.2%
2002	13,358	−6.6%
2011	11,744	−12.1%
2021	11,163	−4.9%
Source: Census data

== Natives ==
- Ferenc Benkő (1745–1816), cleric and mineralogist
- Herman Berkovits (b. 1947), physician
- Grigore Leșe (b. 1954), musician
- Remus Ludu (1914–1982), gymnast
- Árpád-Francisc Márton (b. 1955), politician
- Onișor Nicorec (b. 1986), footballer
- Vasile Oană (b. 1972), footballer

== Economy ==
Răzoare is an old mining village, with iron ore and manganese (as well as muscovite, bentonite, and kaolinite) being exploited here since 1770. Other minerals found in the area are magnetite, garnet, dannemorite, beryl, tourmaline, leucophoenicite, ribbeite, sodalite, and alleghanyite. The Răzoare mine opened in 1988; its closure in 2006 was a heavy blow to the local economy and led to a drop in the town's population.

== Education ==
The town has two high schools: the Petru Rareș Theoretical High School and the Grigore C. Moisil Technological College.
