= Suciu (river) =

River in Romania

- Location within Romania

Location
- Country: Romania
- Counties: Maramureș County
- Villages: Groșii Țibleșului, Suciu de Sus, Suciu de Jos, Dămăcușeni

Physical characteristics
- Source: Mount Cârligătura
  - location: Lăpuș Mountains
  - coordinates: 47°35′59″N 24°08′22″E
  - elevation: 998 m (3,274 ft)
- Mouth: Lăpuș
  - location: Dămăcușeni
  - coordinates: 47°27′27″N 23°54′05″E
  - elevation: 336 m (1,102 ft)
- Length: 36 km (22 mi)
- Basin size: 245 km^{2} (95 sq mi)

Basin features
- Progression: Lăpuș→ Someș→ Tisza→ Danube→ Black Sea

The Suciu (Hungarian: Szőcs-patak) is a left tributary of the river Lăpuș in Maramureș County, Romania. It discharges into the Lăpuș in Dămăcușeni. The section upstream from the confluence with the Brad is also referred to as Minget. Its length is 36 km (22 mi) and its basin size is 245 km^{2} (95 sq mi).

== Tributaries ==
The following rivers are tributaries to the river Suciu:

- Left: Brad, Strâmba, Larga, Periac, Lupoaia
- Right: Valea lui Saleu
