= Țibleș (Someșul Mare) =

- Location within Romania

Location
- Country: Romania
- Counties: Bistrița-Năsăud County
- Villages: Suplai, Poienile Zagrei, Zagra, Mocod

Physical characteristics
- Source: Țibleș Mountains
- Mouth: Someșul Mare
  - location: Mocod
  - coordinates: 47.2630°N 24.3018°E
- Length: 32 km (20 mi)
- Basin size: 98 km^{2} (38 sq mi)

Basin features
- Progression: Someșul Mare→ Someș→ Tisza→ Danube→ Black Sea
- Tributaries
  - left: Găureni

The Țibleș is a right tributary of the river Someșul Mare in Romania. Its source is in the Țibleș Mountains. It discharges into the Someșul Mare in Mocod. Its length is 32 km (20 mi) and its basin size is 98 km^{2} (38 sq mi).
