= Zagra, Bistrița-Năsăud =

Zagra
- Commune
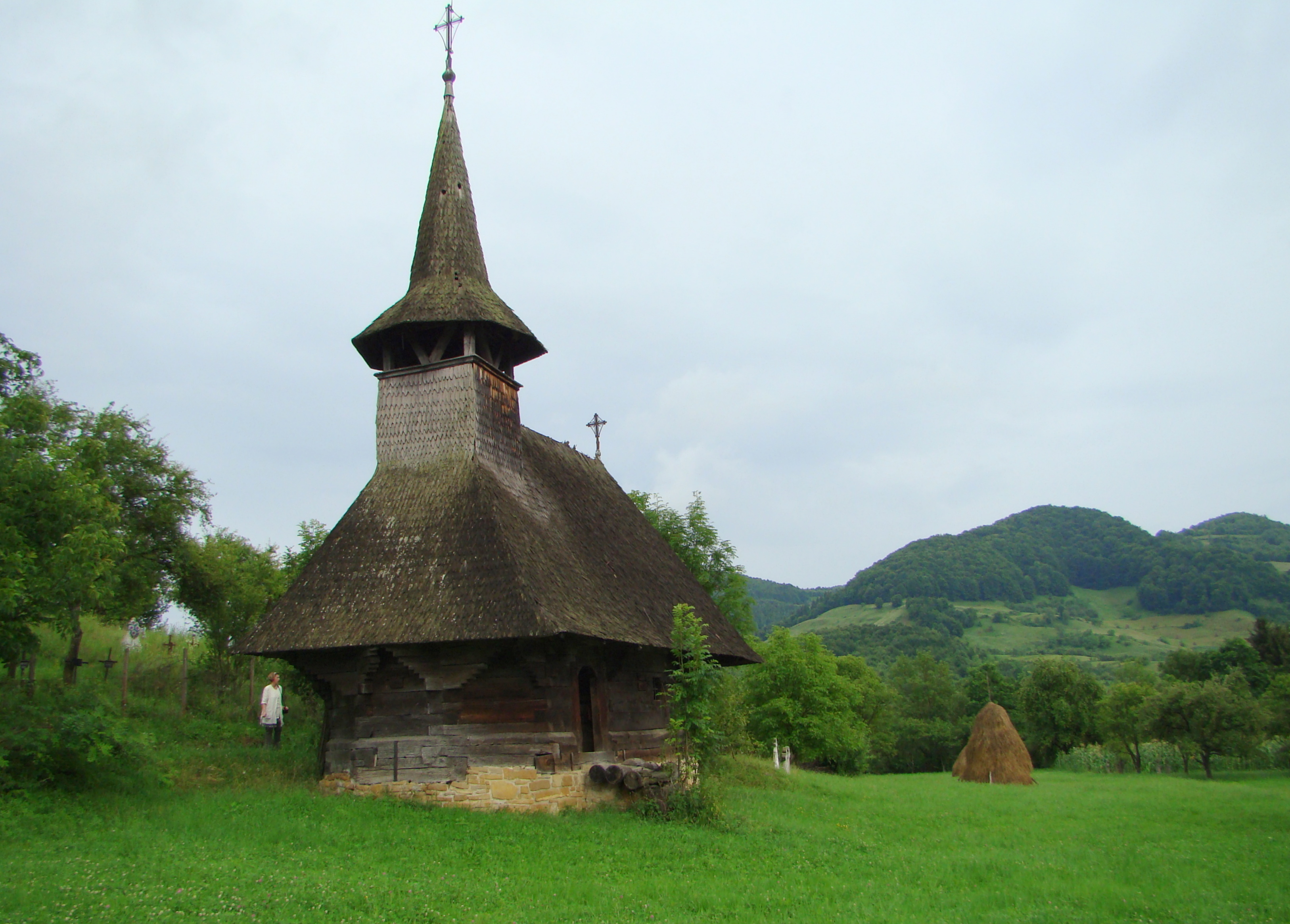
- Saint Paraskeva's wooden church in Zagra

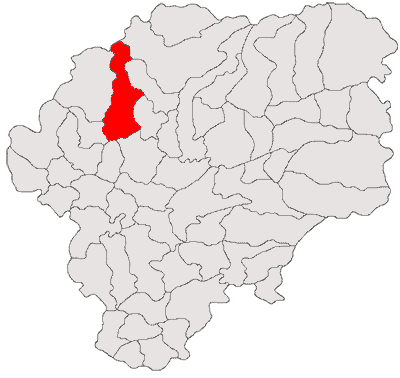
- Location in Bistrița-Năsăud County

- Location in Romania
- Coordinates: 47°20′N 24°16′E
- Country: Romania
- County: Bistrița-Năsăud

Government
  - Mayor (2020–2024): Nicolae-Eugen Bușcoi (PSD)
- Area: 126.00 km^{2} (48.65 sq mi)
- Elevation: 390 m (1,280 ft)
- Population (2021-12-01): 3,354
  - Density: 26.62/km^{2} (68.94/sq mi)
- Time zone: UTC+02:00 (EET)
  - Summer (DST): UTC+03:00 (EEST)
- Postal code: 427385
- Area code: +40 x63
- Vehicle reg.: BN
- Website: www.primariazagra.ro

Zagra (Hungarian: Zágra) is a commune in Bistrița-Năsăud County, Transylvania, Romania. It is composed of five villages: Alunișul (until 1960 Găureni; Gaurény), Perișor (Bethlenkörtvélyes), Poienile Zagrei (Pojény), Suplai (Ciblesfalva), and Zagra.

The commune is situated in a hilly area at the northern edge of the Transylvanian Plateau, on the banks of the river Țibleș. It is located in the northwestern part of the county, on the border with Maramureș County.

== Natives ==
- Nicolae Drăganu (1884–1939), linguist, philologist, and literary historian
