= Coat of arms of Esztergom =

Coat of arms

Coat of arms of Esztergom

The Coat of arms of the Hungarian city of Esztergom is used since the 13th century when the city was guaranteed the use of seal by the king Andrew II of Hungary (1205–1235). Several variations have been introduced through the centuries but the actual coat of arms doesn't stand away from the original one, except for the small variations in the architectural representations of the buildings on it.

The city of Esztergom was the first capital of Hungary, the place where the king Saint Stephen I of Hungary was born and as the tradition says he was also crowned there. During centuries the city was the see of the Archbishop of Esztergom, the highest and most powerful Christian personality on the Hungarian Kingdom, having the right of coronation, the biggest incoming in taxes after the figure of the monarch, and also intervening in the political life through many conflicts during the Medieval, Modern and Contemporary times.

== Description of the coat of arms ==
In the actual coat of arms of the city of Esztergom can be seen the gate of Saint Lorence, behind it can be seen the Palace of Szennye. Below it can be seen the coat of arms of the royal House of Árpád composed by nine stripes (5 reds and 4 whites). The actual colored coat of arms was designed in 1721 by Simon Grabmayer based in the royal seals used in the city through the centuries.

== Bibliography ==
- Tóth Krisztina: Esztergom szabad királyi város jegyzőkönyveinek regesztái 1719-1722
- Megpecsételt történelem – Középkori pecsétek Esztergomból (2000)
