= Solva (Hungary) =

Early name for what is now Esztergom, Hungary

Coordinates: 47°47′44″N 18°44′30″E

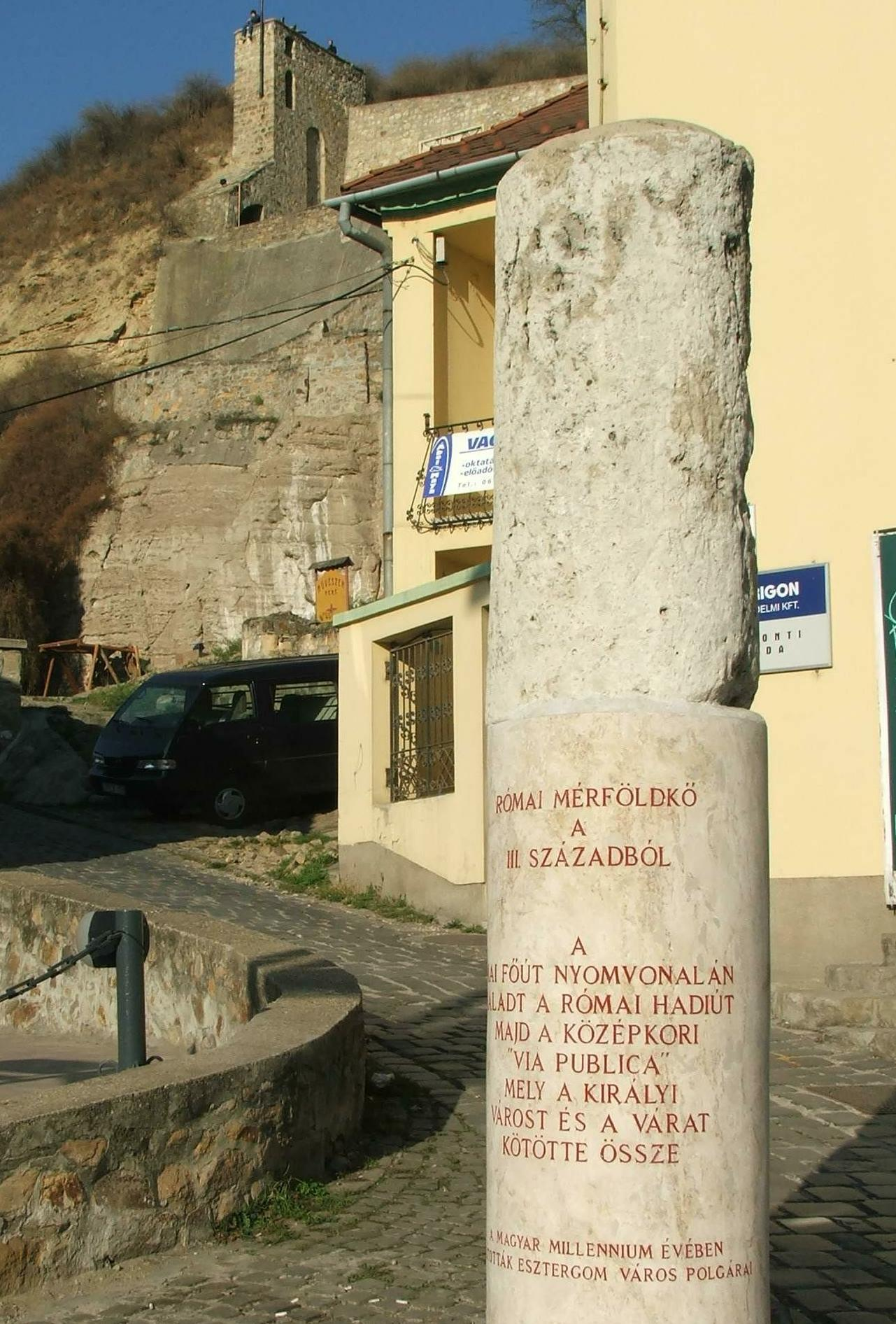
Roman miliarium from Solva

Solva was an early name for what is now Esztergom, Hungary, in the province of Pannonia, during the Roman period. It was an important part of the limes line along the Danube. Solva was granted town rank by Publius Aelius Hadrianus in 121 AD.
