= Gábor Tarkövi =

Hungarian trumpeter (born 1969)

- Born: March 13, 1969 (age 57); Esztergom, Hungary
- Genre: Classical
- Occupations: Musician, professor
- Instrument: Trumpet
- Formerly of: Wurttemberg Philharmonic Orchestra; Berlin Symphonie Orchestra; Bayern Radio Symphony Orchestra; Berlin Philharmonic
- Website: tarkoevigabor.com

Gábor Tarkövi is a Hungarian trumpeter.

== Career ==
Tarkövi was born to a family of musicians and began learning trumpet from his father at the age of 9. After graduating from the Richter János Conservatory in Győr, he studied with György Geiger and Frigyes Varasdy at the Franz Liszt Academy of Music in 1987.

He made his orchestral debut as co-principal trumpet of the Wurttemberg Philharmonic Orchestra. He then held principal trumpet roles with the Berlin Symphonie Orchestra and the Bayern Radio Symphony Orchestra. He was the principal trumpet of the Berlin Philharmonic from 2004 to 2019, leaving to focus on teaching at the Berlin University of the Arts.

He played on trumpets made by Schagerl beginning in 1996.
