= List of mayors of Esztergom =

This is a list of mayors of Esztergom, Hungary.

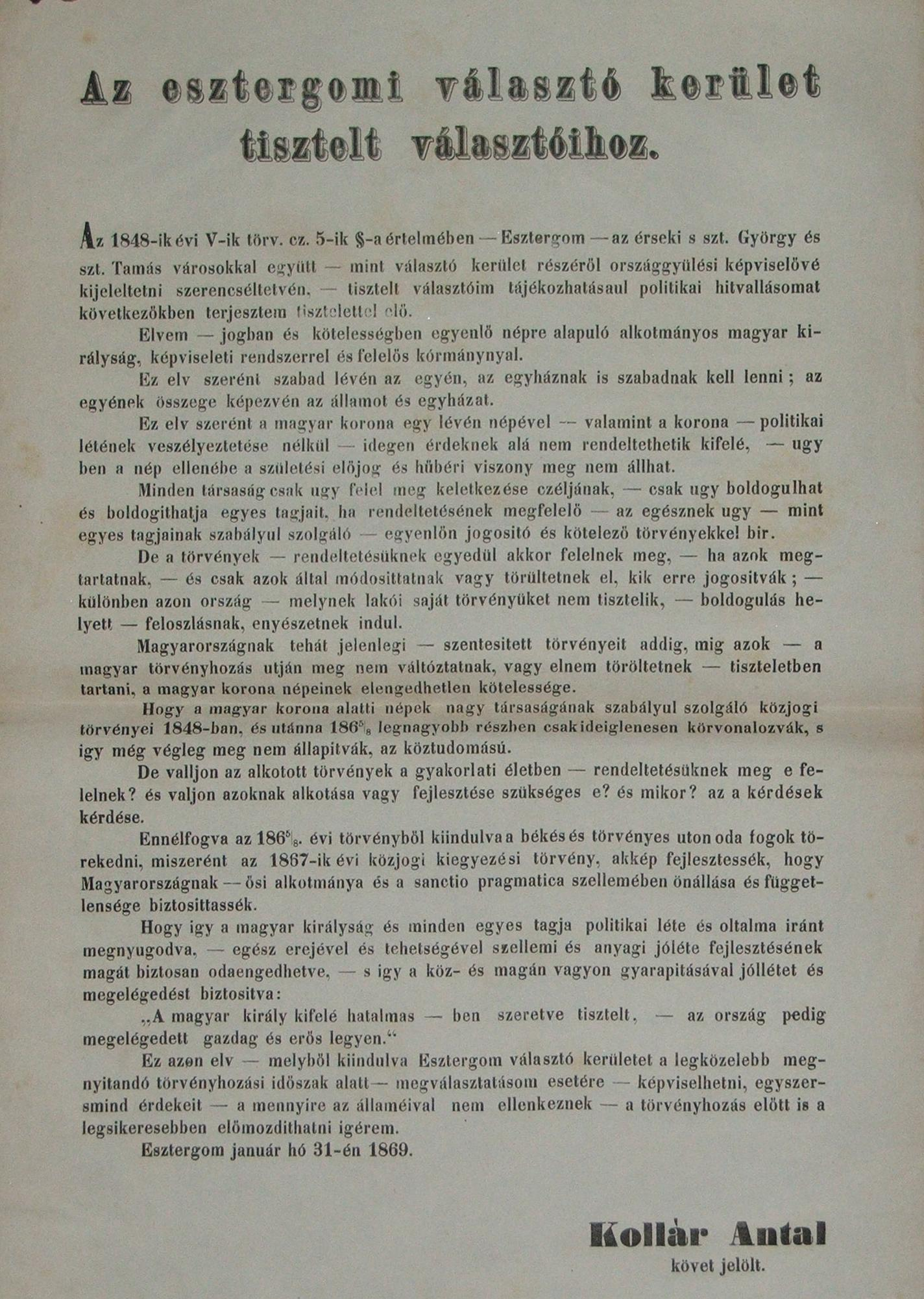
1869 parliamentary election poster of Antal Kollár, mayor of Esztergom

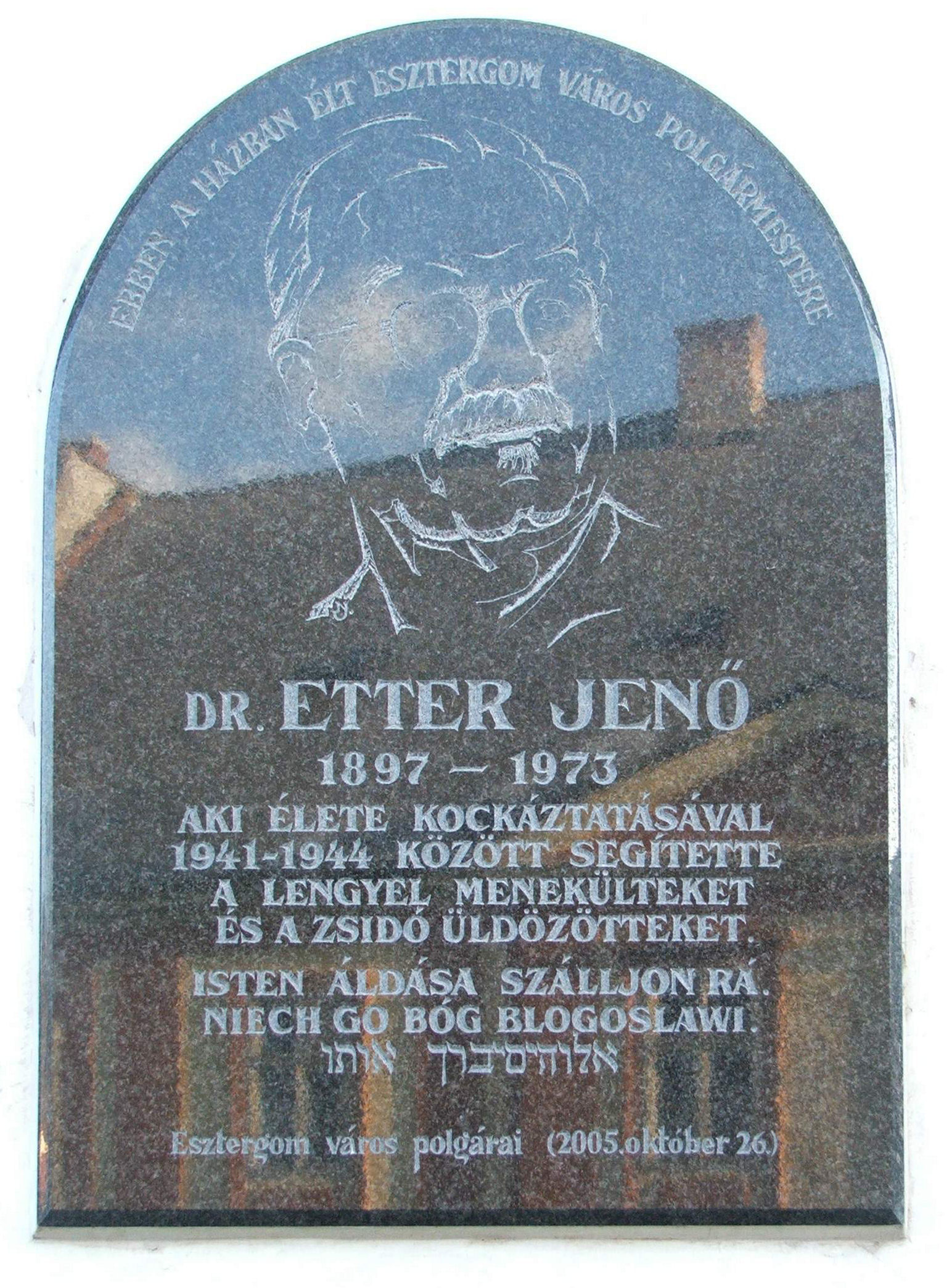
Plaque of Jenő Etter in Víziváros

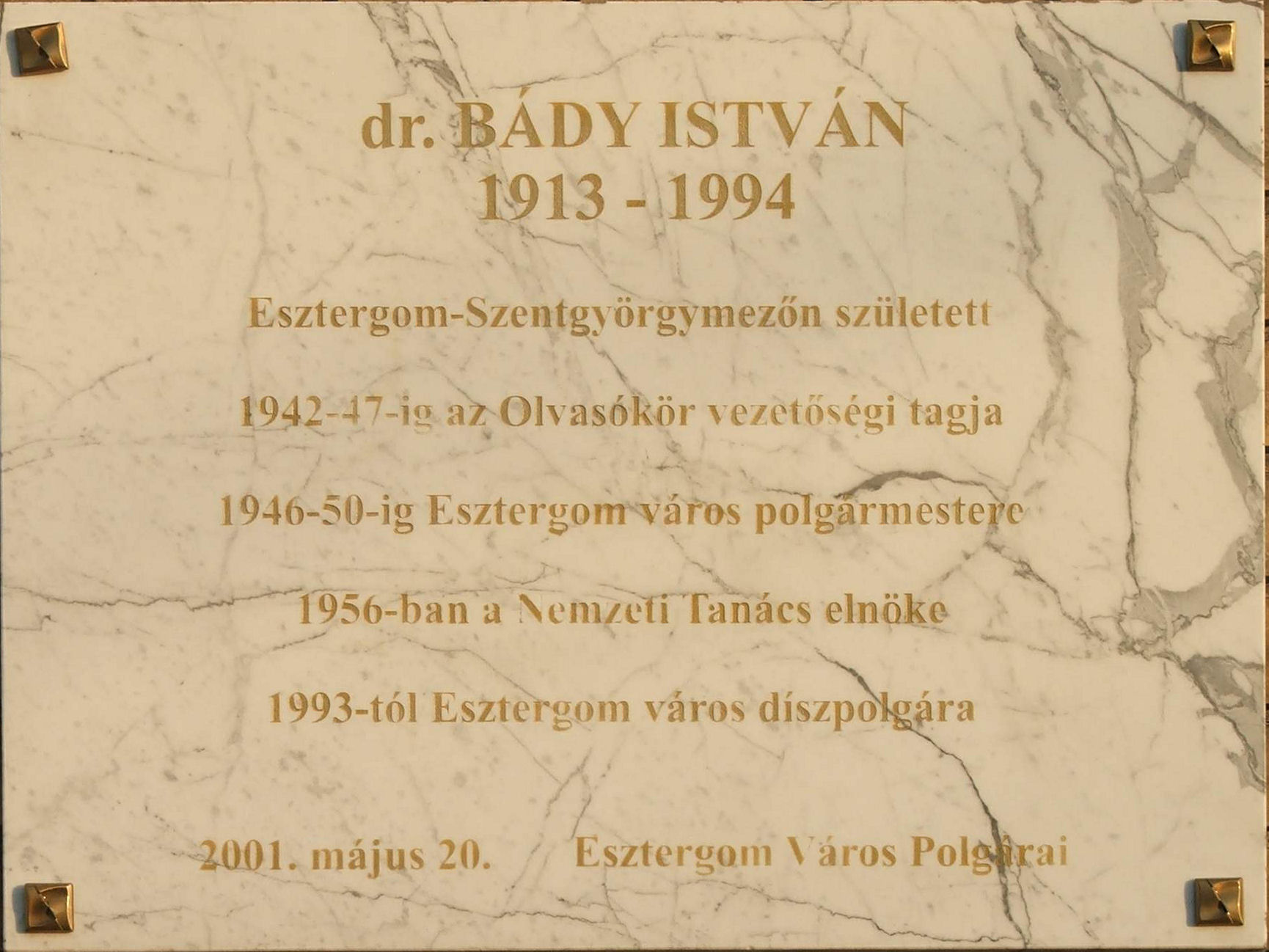
Plaque of dr. István Bády in Szentgyörgymező

Name	Term	Notes
Bálint Falk	1808–1810	City judge between 1802 and 1805, Member of parliament 1805-1807
Antal Kollár	1810–1818	
Ferenc Muzsik	1818–1823	
János Falk	1824–1829	
Ferenc Krakovitzer	1830–1838	
Imran Sipos	1838-1842	
Ignác Hartmann	1842–1846	
István Takáts	1846–1860	
Antal Kollár	1861–1862	First time
József Sziklay	1862–1867	
Antal Kollár	1867–1877	Second time
Károly Palkovics	1877–1881	
József Sziklay	March 29, 1881 – May 15, 1881	Second time
János Papp	1881–1886	
dr. Antal Helcz	October 24, 1886 – June, 1895	Resigned
József Niedermann	June 13, 1895 –	Acting mayor
Lajos Malina	July, 1895 – October 13, 1899	Resigned for health reasons, died later that year
Károly Kollár	May 23, 1899 – November 15, 1899	Acting mayor
Imre Vimmer	November 15, 1899 – 1915	
Dr. Béla Antóny	1915–1930	Resigned
Gyula Glatz	1931–1940	Acting mayor, then mayor
dr. Jenő Etter	January 20, 1941 – 1944	
Dr. József Sudár	1944–1945	
Ferenc Mikler	April 8, 1945 –	First communist mayor of Esztergom
Ferenc Schalkház	April 28, 1945 – May 16	Acting mayor
Dr. György Hajdu	May 16, 1945 – July 17, 1946	
Dr. István Bády	July 17, 1946 – July 6, 1950	Resigned
István Szabó	July 7, 1950–31	
Zoltán Sipos	July 31, 1950 – August 15	Mayor of Komárom, acting mayor of Esztergom for two weeks

== Communist Hungary ==
Name	Term	Notes
Imre Anderla	August, 1950 – 1953	
László Fábián	1953-1954	
Klára Horváth	1954-1957	
András Lázár	1957-1963	
Miklós Boza	1963-1968	
Imre Szabó	1968-1971	
Antal Brunszkó	1971 – 1989	
Tibor Simon	1989-1990	

== Mayors since 1990 ==
Name	Term	Notes
Dr. László Könözsy	1990–1999	Resigned
Tamás Meggyes	1999–2010	Acting from 1999, mayor since 2000
Éva Tétényi	2010–2014	
Etelka Romanek	2014–2019	
Ádám Hernádi	2019–in office	
