= Siege of Esztergom =

Siege of Esztergom may refer to

- Siege of Esztergom (1241)
- Siege of Esztergom (1543)
- Siege of Esztergom (1595)
- Siege of Esztergom (1605)
- Siege of Esztergom (1685)
