= Szentgyörgy =

The Hungarian name Szentgyörgy can refer to:

- Svätý Jur (Pozsonyszentgyörgy) in Slovakia
- Sfântu Gheorghe (Sepsiszentgyörgy) in Romania
- Szentgyörgymező, Esztergom, Hungary
