= Tamás Meggyes =

Hungarian politician

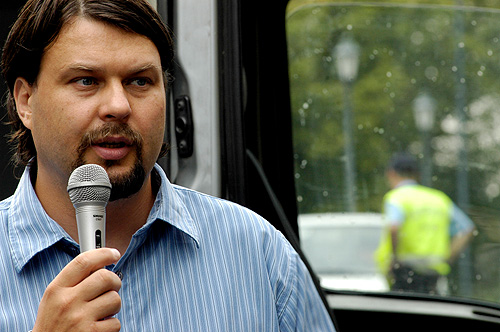

Member of the National Assembly
- In office 16 May 2006 – 5 May 2014

Mayor of Esztergom
- In office 9 November 1999 – 3 October 2010
- Preceded by: László Könözsy
- Succeeded by: Éva Tétényi

Personal details
- Born: 7 March 1967 (age 59) Budapest, Hungary
- Party: Fidesz
- Children: 2
- Profession: politician

Tamás Meggyes (born 7 March 1967) is a Hungarian politician, who served as mayor of Esztergom between 1999 and 2010. He was also Member of Parliament for Esztergom (Komárom-Esztergom County Constituency V) in the National Assembly of Hungary from 2010 to 2014. Formerly he was also MP from Fidesz Komárom-Esztergom County Regional List from 2006 to 2010. He obtained his absolutorium in 2010 in the Kodolányi János University of Applied Sciences.

== Personal life ==
He is married and has two children.

Political offices
Preceded by László Könözsy	Mayor of Esztergom; 1999–2010	Succeeded by Éva Tétényi
