= Éva Tétényi =

Hungarian politician

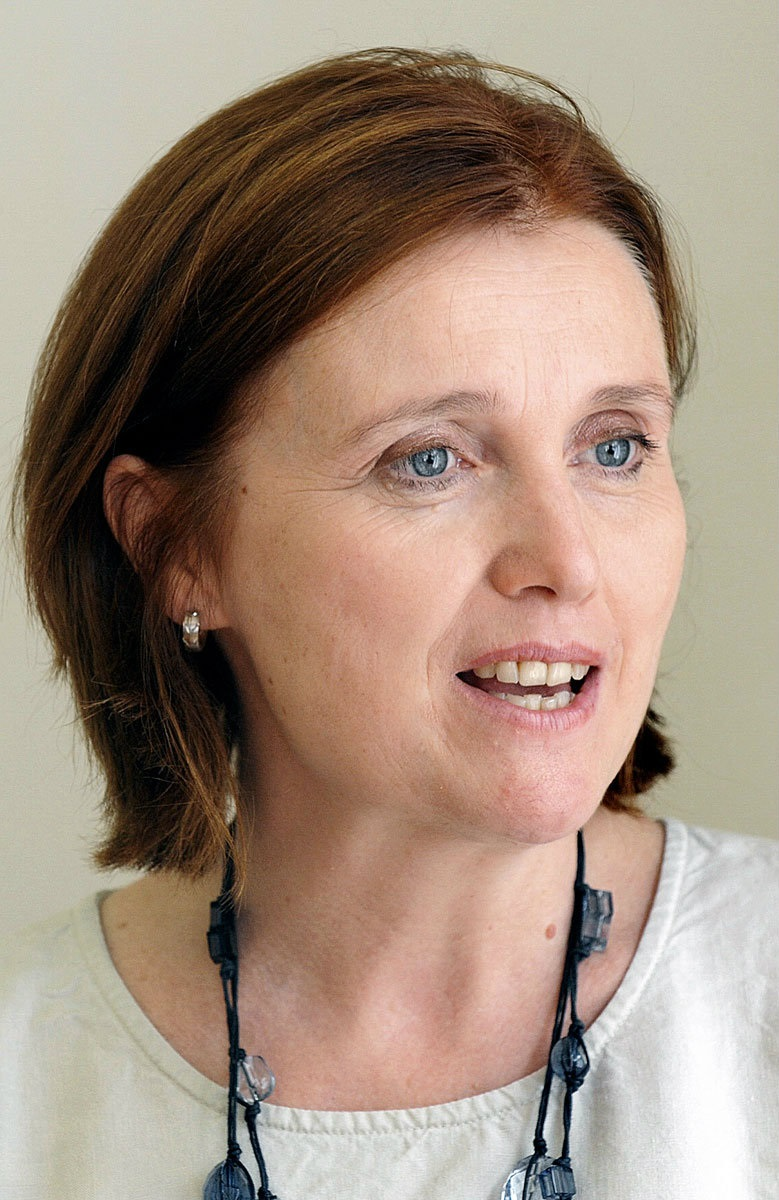

Mayor of Esztergom
- In office 3 October 2010 – 12 October 2014
- Preceded by: Tamás Meggyes
- Succeeded by: Etelka Romanek

Personal details
- Born: 25 December 1961 (age 64) Esztergom, Hungary
- Party: Independent
- Profession: architect, politician

Éva Tétényi (born 25 December 1961) is a Hungarian politician, who served as the mayor of Esztergom between 2010 and 2014. Tétényi formerly worked as an architect.

== Politics ==
She was born 25 December 1961 in Esztergom, Hungary. Before her political career, Tétényi worked as an architect. She was the chief architect of the 6th district of Budapest, and later the chief architect of Győr-Moson-Sopron County, and was the member of the executive board of the Architects' Council of Europe. Tétényi ran for mayor of Esztergom during the 2010 municipal elections with several parties urging their voters to support Tétényi. Jobbik, Politics Can Be Different (LMP) and Hungarian Socialist Party (MSZP) were among those who provided such support. Tétényi, thanks to her broad support, was elected with two-thirds of the votes, against the Fidesz-supported Tamás Meggyes. As there was no similar agreement between the Tétényi supporting parties for city council (Jobbik, MSZP, LMP each ran separate candidates there), the election for city council was won by the Fidesz party, which holds two-thirds of the seats there. Tétényi is not a member of any political party.

Since in the Hungarian political system most of the power in local government was delegated to the council as opposed to one person mayoral rule, this caused constant conflict between the mayor and the council. The city council with votes from the Fidesz party illegally restricted the powers of the mayor, and her immediate co-workers were fired one by one.

Tétényi several times proposed disbanding the council. Tétényi then announced violating the law, claiming it was her right as civil disobedience, and refused to chair the council meetings except for decisions about the debt settlement and the reorganization plan. With no vice-mayor present due to an earlier resignation and Tétényi's refusal to consent to the appointment of any new vice-mayors, this meant that there is nobody legally able to chair council meetings. This effectively had shut down the local government in Esztergom completely. The shutdown occurred at a time when the city was struggling to meet its financial obligations and a possible default would mean the loss of all properties owned by the city. Tétényi claimed the reason for her actions is the city council's inability to cooperate with her as the elected mayor. Tétényi remained highly popular among the citizens of Esztergom, she also won the election by a large margin.

During the June 2011 Tétényi made several demands such as the resignation of three members of the city council and the appointment of Jobbik politician Andrea Stámusz as vice mayor. These she said would help resolve the situation. A significant issue facing the city government was debt restructuring, with total debt reaching 25 bn HUF, caused by the previous mayor, Meggyes. In 2011 the companies owned by Esztergom wrote an open letter to Tétényi, publicly asking her to end the shutdown of the local government and call the city council together and chair the meetings. Several actions regarding their functioning such as review and acceptance of the balance sheet requires a council vote. The letter said they will regard Tétényi as personally responsible for the monetary and other damages (such as a possible violation of Cth law of 2000. on accounting). In July 2011 an LMP politician, Gergely Karácsony, proposed an election coalition between Jobbik-LMP-MSZP, to change certain laws enacted by Fidesz. He cited Éva Tétényi's case, as a precedent of how such a proposal could work.

Tétényi ran for mayor of Esztergom during the 2014 municipal elections for the second time as an independent candidate. She was also supported by DK and Együtt–PM, however Jobbik had an own mayoral candidate in 2014. Éva Tétényi lost to Etelka Romanek (Fidesz–KDNP) and came to the second place with 43.39 percent of the votes.

== Controversy ==
In July 2011 Tétényi called his political opponents "retards". She also threatened physical violence against them, saying "one by one you should be beaten". Tétényi's words were recorded and played for the press. The statements caused controversy as they stepped across the usual boundaries of political discourse. The political opponents of Tétényi also received death threats at the time signed from the "Man from Esztergom". Tétényi didn't distance herself from the threats when asked to do so. Tétényi said that even though the discussion took place in a TV studio, it was after the end of the TV program, making her words part of a private conversation. Tétényi have asked the government to appoint a governmental overseer, to watch over the affairs of Esztergom.

== See also ==
- Esztergom

Political offices
Preceded by Tamás Meggyes	Mayor of Esztergom; 2010–2014	Succeeded by Etelka Romanek
