= Víziváros =

Neighborhood of Esztergom, Hungary

Coordinates: 47°47′54″N 18°44′4″E

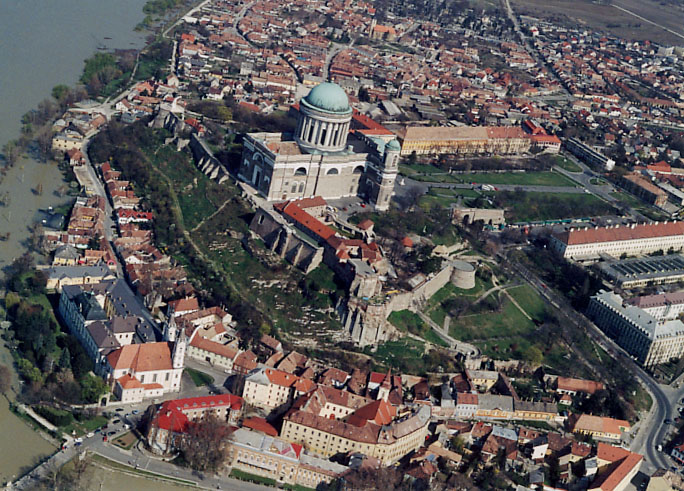
Castle hill

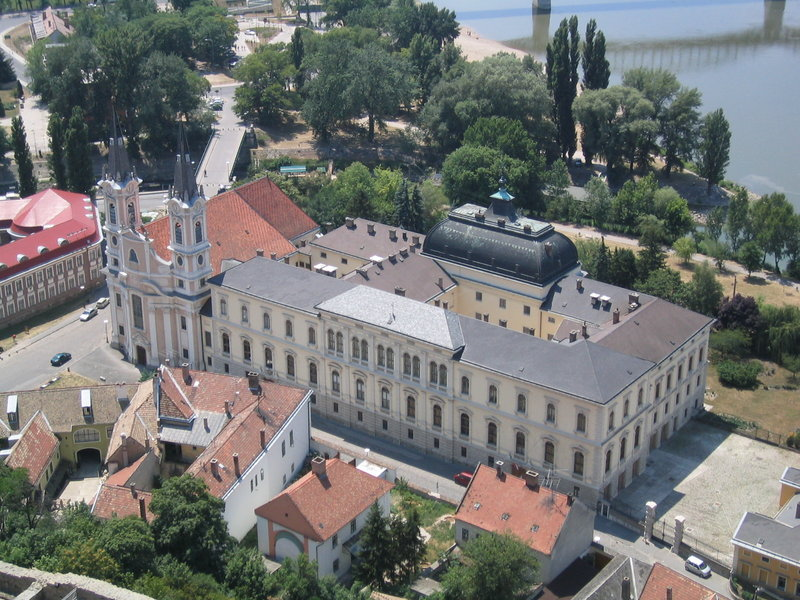
Christian Museum

Víziváros (meaning Watertown, Latin: Civitas Archiepiscopalis, German: Wasserstadt) is a neighborhood of Esztergom, Hungary, on the right bank of the Danube, under the royal castle and the St. Adalbert Primatial Basilica. The name Watertown derives from the numerous hot springs in the area.

== History ==
Víziváros was established by Matthias Rátót, Archbishop of Esztergom, in 1239. The town fell under Ottoman rule in 1543. Apart from a 10 year period between 1595 and 1605, when it was captured during the Long Turkish War, it was finally taken back by Christian forces in 1683. During those 130 years, the Turks built baths, religious buildings and re-enforced the castle. The Öziçeli Hacci Ibrahim Mosque on Berényi Zsigmond street is the oldest still standing mosque of the Ottoman Empire along the Danube.

After the siege of 1683 reconstruction of the town began, but during Rákóczi's War for Independence it was destroyed in the winter of 1705–1706. Víziváros was repopulated by Germans. In 1827 its population was 697. By 1891 the town had 1158 Hungarian residents. The Cathedral Library (Bibliotheca) opened in 1853. The library building was designed by József Hild. The Christian Museum was founded by archbishop János Simor in 1875, when he opened his private collection of religious art to visitors. The Primatial Palace was built in 1883. In 1895 Víziváros was merged with Royal Esztergom as third district. The same time neighboring Szentgyörgymező became fourth and Szenttamás became second district.

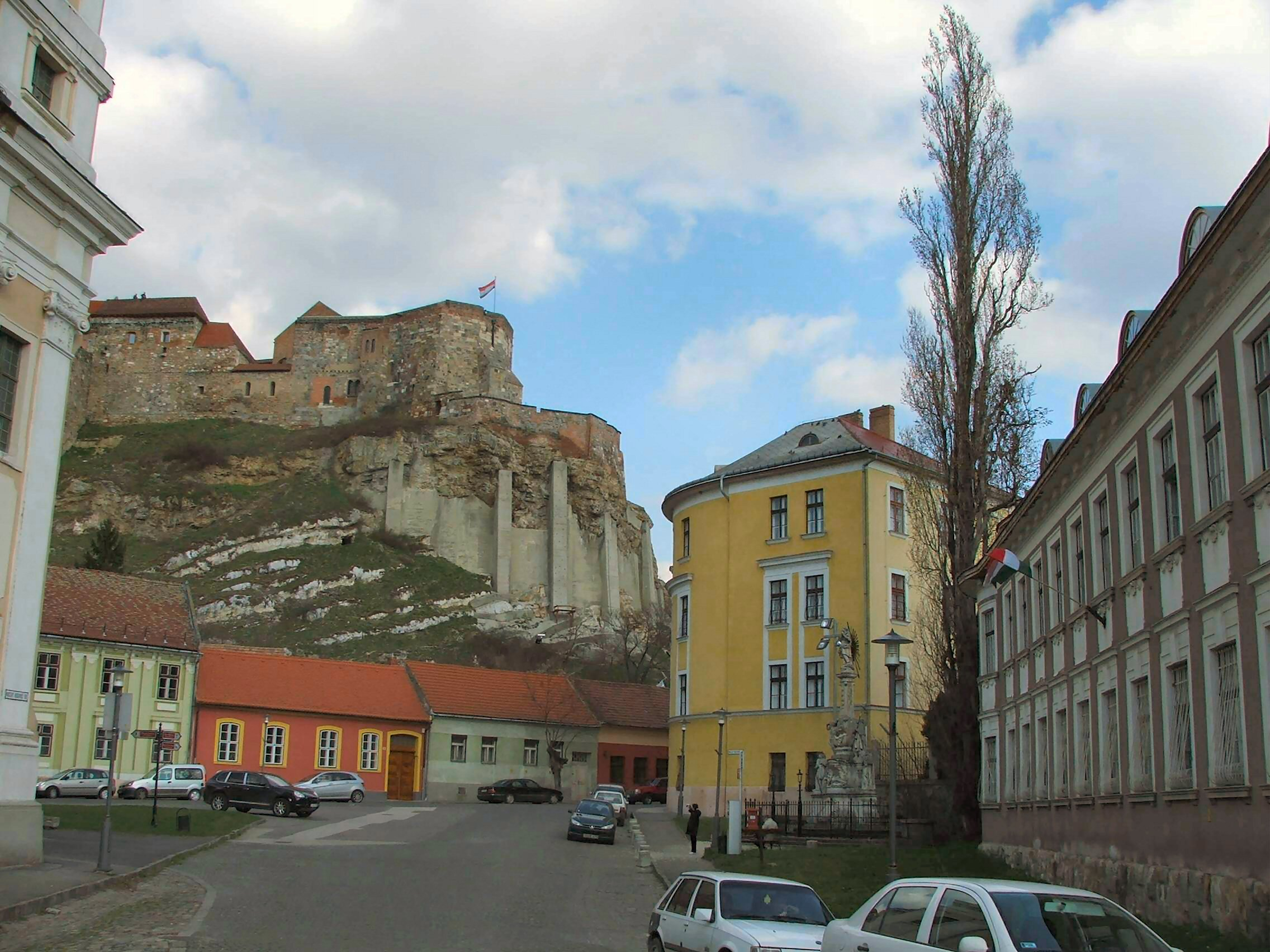
Mindszenty Square

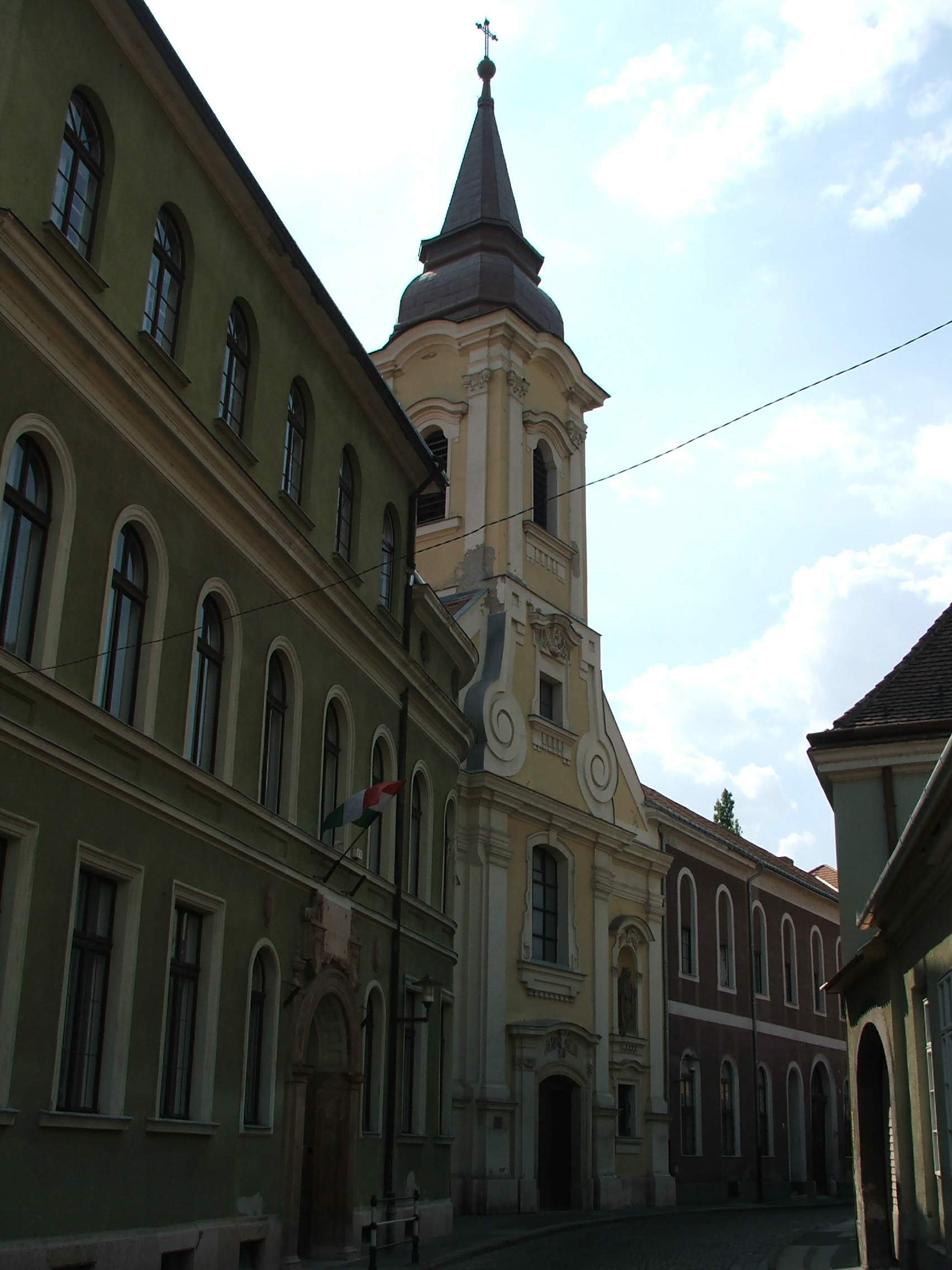
Péter Pázmány Street

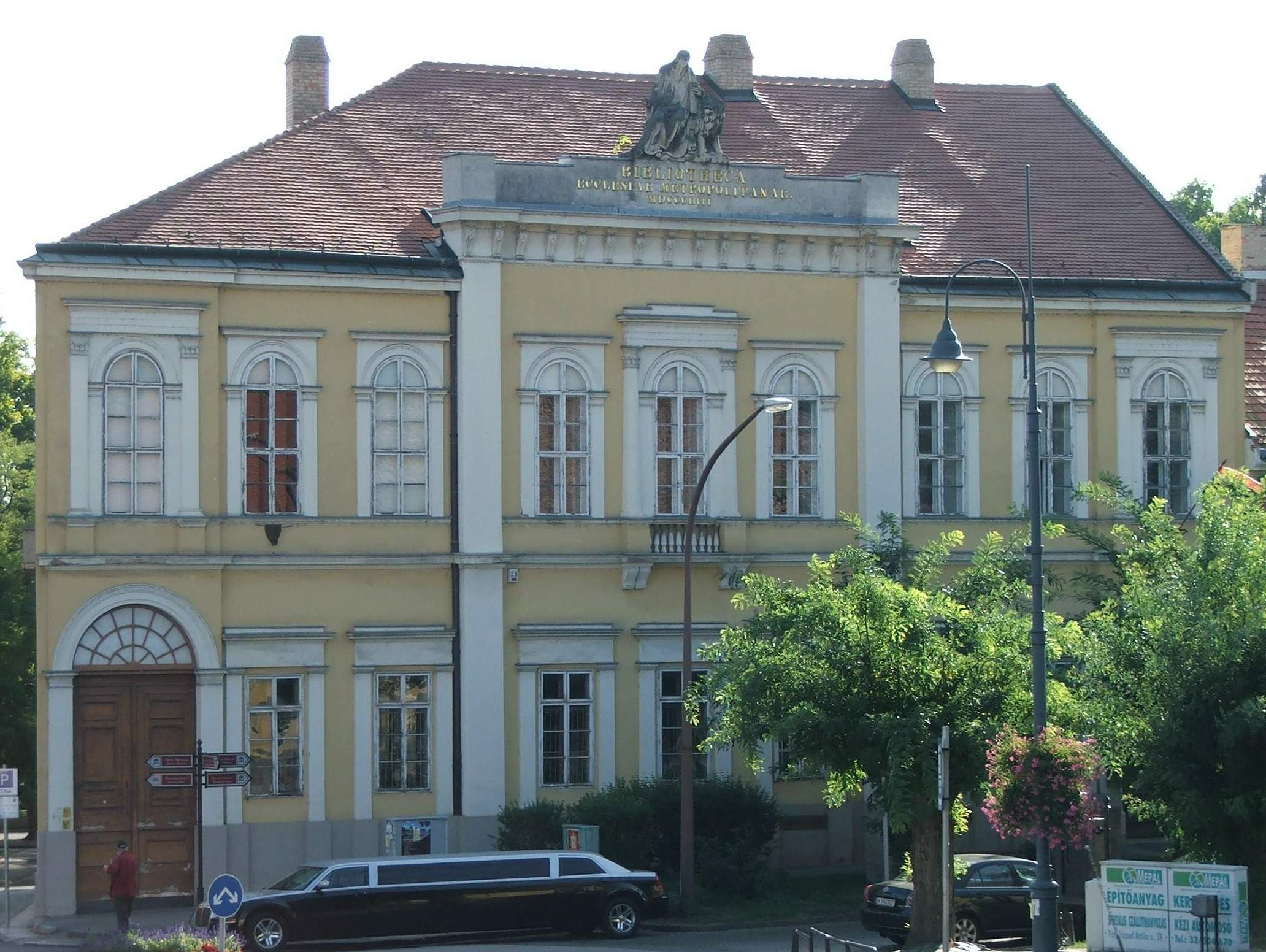
Bibliotheca - The Cathedral Library
