= Siege of Esztergom (1595) =

Engagement between Habsburg and Ottoman Empires

- Part of the Long Turkish War
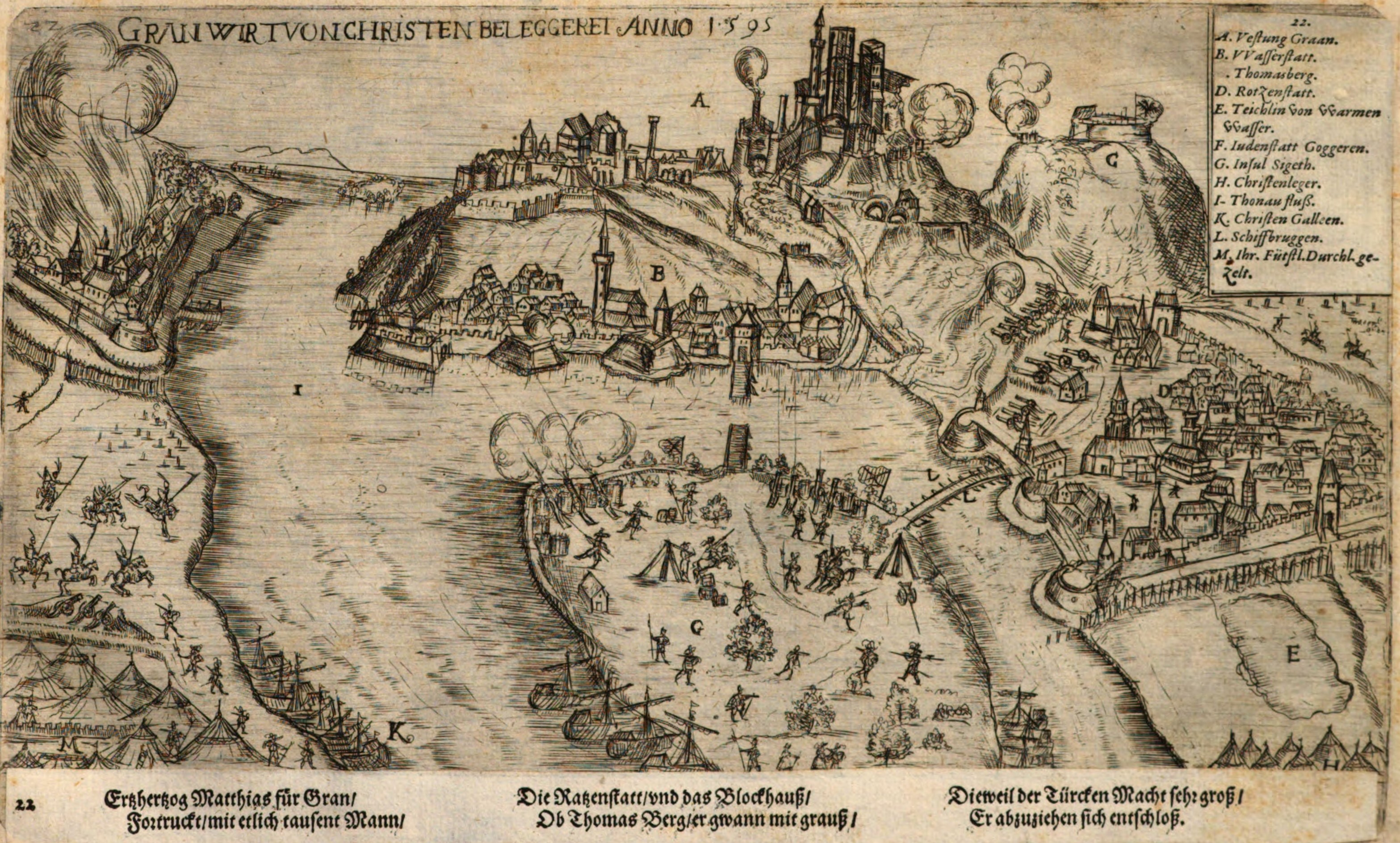
- The siege of Esztergom as depicted by Wilhelm Peter Zimmermann
Date	1 July – 2 September 1595
Location	Esztergom, Hungary
Result	Habsburg victory

Belligerents
(Holy Roman Empire) Habsburg Empire	Ottoman Empire

Commanders and leaders
(Holy Roman Empire) Karl von Mansfeld (DOW) (Holy Roman Empire) Archduke Matthias (Papal States) Giovanni Francesco Aldobrandino	Kara Ali Beg

Strength
ca. 35,000 men	Garrison of 2,700; Relief force of 20,000 men

Casualties and losses
Unknown	Unknown

The Siege of Esztergom was a military engagement in 1595 between the Habsburg Empire and the Ottoman Empire during the Long War. The Imperial army, consisting of various ethnicities, primarily led by Karl von Mansfeld, managed to force the Turkish garrison to surrender the city.

== Background ==
Though the Habsburg and the Ottoman Empire had been nominally at peace since the accession of emperor Rudolf II in 1576, the Turks had frequently raided the Habsburg territories in Hungary. After the end of the Ottoman-Safavid war in 1590, the Ottomans resumed their border campaigns, possibly in order to keep their soldiers occupied and allow them to supplement their wages with plunder as their funds were short. In 1591, the Ottomans first attacked in northern Slavonia and against the Kupa line, taking Ripač and in the following year the nearby key fortress of Bihać, killing and enslaving its inhabitants. The taking of the city discomforted the newly elected pope Clement VIII, who started planning to form a league against the Turks, similar to some of his predecessors. This border warfare intensified in 1593 when the Ottoman governor of Bosnia, Telli Hasan Pasha, and his Bosnian ghazi army besieged Sisak, which he had already unsuccessfully attempted to capture in the two previous years. A quickly assembled army of Austrians and Croatians was able to surprise Hasan Pasha and defeat him and his forces in the battle of Sisak on 22 June 1593, leading to widespread celebrations throughout Western Europe.

The Habsburg victory resulted in the Ottomans declaring war in the summer of 1593, starting the Long Turkish War. Sinan Pasha, the beylerbey of Rumelia, was appointed as Ottoman commander and Ottoman forces captured Sisak in August 1593. For the remainder of the year and the following, both sides captured various cities without gaining a significant advantage. An extraordinary Imperial Diet in Regensburg approved an extraordinary subvention for the war with the Turks from which 4,100 cavalry and 9,000 infantry were hired.

Meanwhile, pope Clement VIII had responded to the Turkish aggression by sending diplomatic missions to both Western European rulers such as Rudolf II and Philip II of Spain but also a secret mission in 1594 under Aleksandar Komulović, rector of the church of San Girolamo dei Croati, to persuade the rulers of Transylvania, Moldavia, Wallachia, Poland and Muscovy to join his proposed league. This was crowned with some success as Sigismund Báthory, the prince of Transylvania and the voivodes Michael the Brave of Wallachia and Aaron of Moldavia switched sides to the Habsburgs and took action against the Turks between December 1594 and February 1595. When on 16 January 1595, sultan Murad III died and his son Mehmed III offered peace to Rudolf II, but Rudolf felt strong enough to reject it and instead ordered his forces to take Esztergom.

== Siege ==
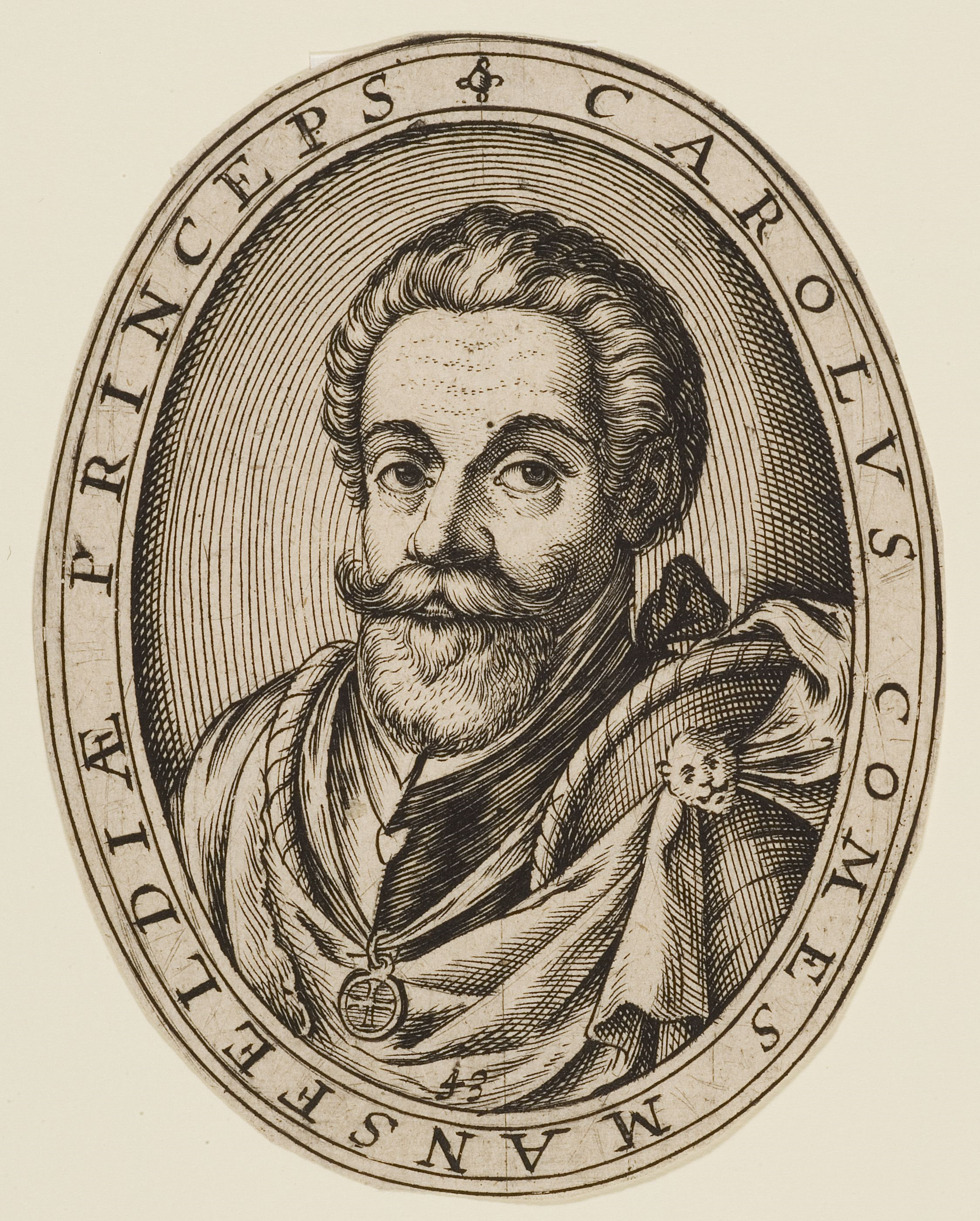
Karl von Mansfeld led the Imperial troops for most of the siege

Esztergom, also known as Gran, held both military significance as it controlled the main route to Vienna but also religious and symbolic significance as the seat of the Hungarian primates and Hungarian Catholicism. Situated on the Danube, it consisted of a walled town, a fortress and several structures along the river. The town had been conquered by the Ottomans in 1543 and in 1594, the Habsburg had already besieged Esztergom, resulting in heavy losses for both sides (including the influential Hungarian poet Bálint Balassi).

Emperor Rudolf once again appointed Matthias to besiege the city, but sought to place a capable military leader alongside the militarily inexperienced archduke as deputy commander-in-chief. To that end, he had requested the governor of the Netherlands to transfer the high-ranking officer Karl von Mansfeld to the Hungarian war theatre in October 1594. The army consisted of both men from the Habsburg core lands such as Austria, Bohemia, Moravia and Hungary and but also from the various provinces of the Holy Roman Empire.

Karl von Mansfeld and his Imperial forces laid siege to Esztergom on 1 July 1595. The army first took Párkány, a fortress on the opposite bank of the Danube. The Ottoman garrison attempted to launch some attacks against the Imperial camp between 25 July and 3 August, none of which were successful.

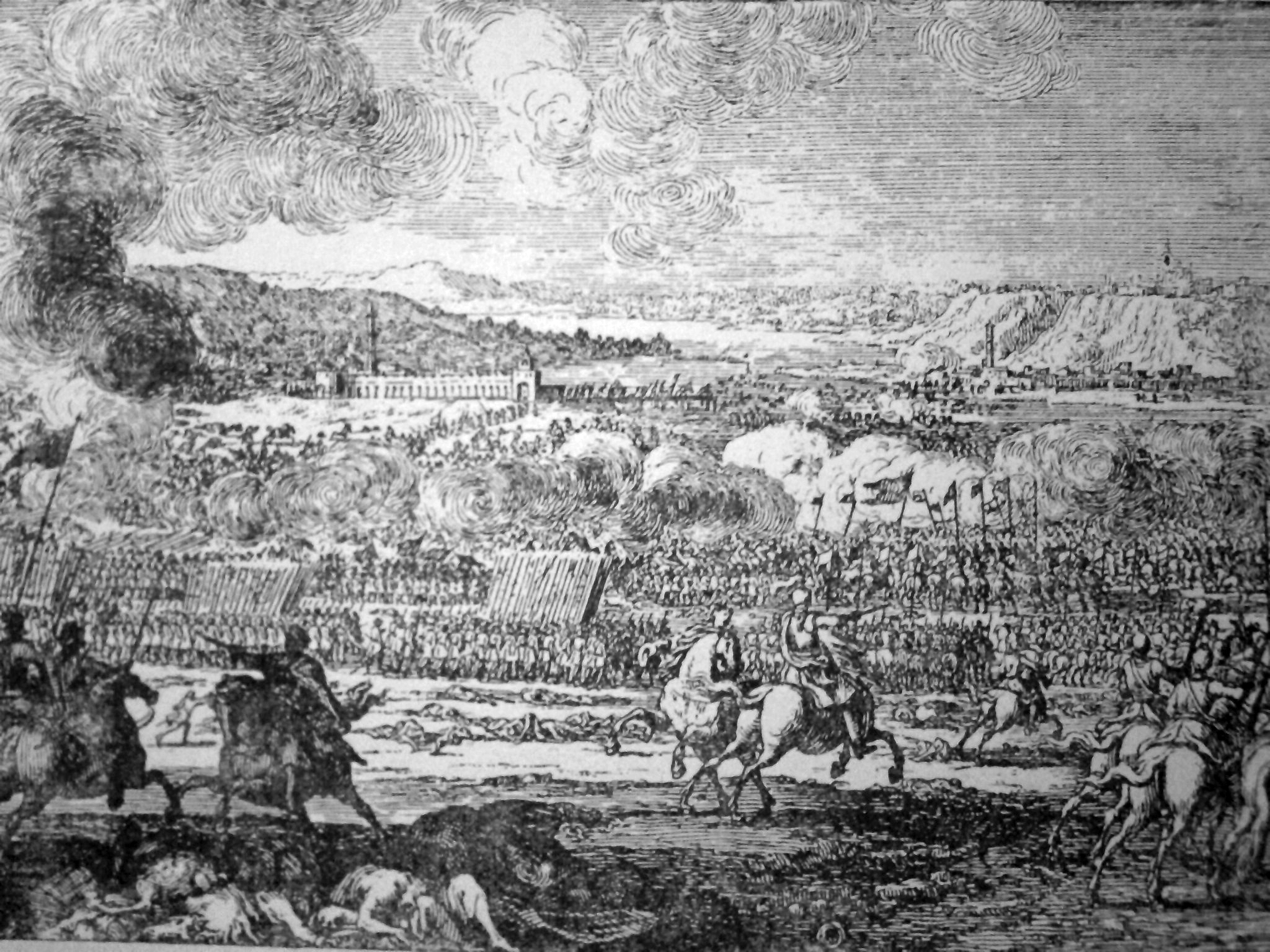
Battle of Párkány in 1595

In light of these defeats, Koca Mehmed, the son of grand vizier Koca Sinan Pasha, decided to launch an attack with all his forces on 4 August. His plan was to launch a diversion attack on the access ways to the city with his Tatars and other cavalry forces while his main forces, including the infantry, to attack the siege camp. The Ottomans advance was however in poor order and significantly slowed down by their baggage train. Hungarian Hussars under Miklós Pálffy intercepted the cavalry forces on the left side of the Danube and when the main force under Koca Mehmed appeared in front of the Imperial camp, starting to deploy its half-moon battle formation, the Imperial heavy cavalry were already alerted and threw the advancing enemy back. Only 1,400 infantry were able to reach Esztergom while the rest was either killed or captured. Afterwards, the Imperial army plundered the Ottoman camp, capturing around 1,500 Ottoman tents, 39 culverins, 100 camels, 27 banners, carpets and books.

Unfortunately, Mansfeld had been wounded and, after transferring leadership to archduke Matthias who had arrived at the siege camp on 18 August, was transported to Komárom, where he died on 30 August. The Imperial forces and their allies suffered significantly from the weather in Hungary and lost many men to diseases. Not long after the battle, however, 700 cavalry from the duchy of Mantua and 3,000 infantry from Milan joined the Imperial forces and on 22 August further a papal force of 13,000 commanded by Giovanni Francesco Aldobrandini, nephew of pope Clement VIII, re-enforced the allied troops. Another Ottoman raid on the Imperial siege camp was beaten back in the morning of 27 August and not long after, on 2 September, the Turkish garrison negotiated their surrendered of the city in exchange for free retreat.

== Aftermath ==
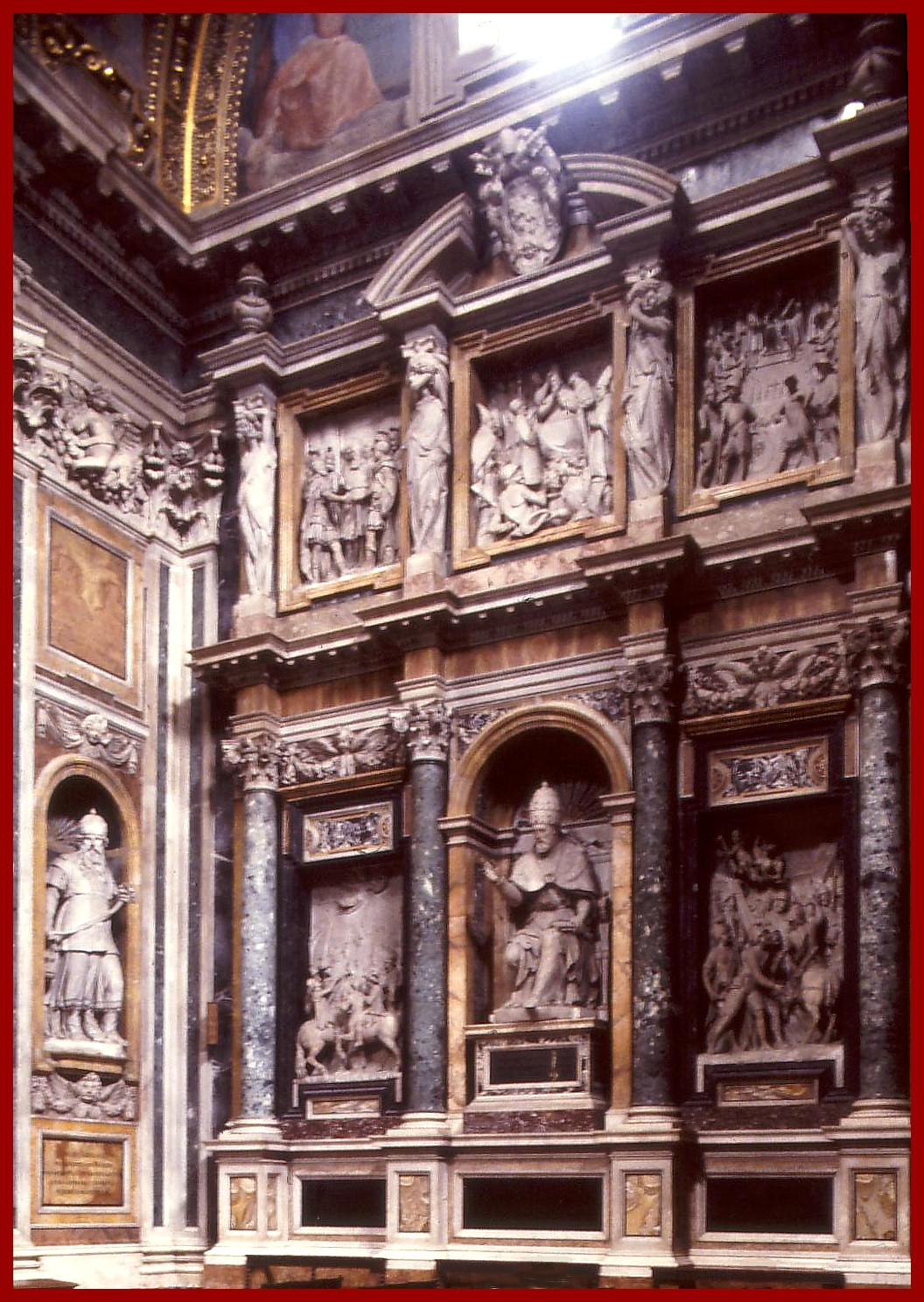
Camillo Mariani depicted Giovanni Francesco Aldobrandini leading the Papal troops at the siege of Esztergom on the tomb of pope Clement VIII in Santa Maria Maggiore (lower right register)

The recovery of Esztergom by Christian forces was considered a miraculous victory, especially given its topography and fortifications. A monument depicting the siege in the Pauline Chapel of the basilica of Santa Maria Maggiore was created by Italian sculptor Camillo Mariani.

Six days afterwards, Giovanni Francesco Aldobrandini succeeded in taking the nearby Visegrad before campaign season ended and the Italian troops were recalled. Overall, the Ottomans had few successes in 1595, including the ignominious end of the Wallachia campaign, alerted the Ottoman court. Following an earthquake in Anatolia, sultan Mehmed III ordered three days of prayer to ward off bad omens.

Esztergom was taken again by the Ottomans in 1605, but then surrendered to the Habsburgs in 1606 in the Peace of Zsitvatorok, which ended the Long Turkish War. The war had demonstrated the end of Ottoman superiority on the battlefield, though it did not yet end their conquests. Nevertheless, the city continued to change hands until the Ottomans were finally expelled in 1683 following their defeat in the battle of Vienna in 1683.

== Sources ==
- Bagi, Zoltán Péter (2001). "Az 1595-ben Esztergom ostromára rendelt császári hadsereg szervezete és felépítése.[THE ORGANISATION AND STRUCTURE OF THE IMPERIAL ARMY COMMANDED TO BESIEGE ESZTERGOM IN 1595]". HADTÖRTÉNELMI KÖZLEMÉNYEK. 114 (2–3): 391–444.
- Heenan, Patrick (28 October 2013). "Esztergom". In Ring, Trudy; Watson, Noelle; Schellinger, Paul (eds.). Northern Europe: International Dictionary of Historic Places. Routledge. pp. 272–275. ISBN 978-1-136-63944-9.
- Hötte, Hans H. A. (20 March 2015). Atlas of Southeast Europe: Geopolitics and History. Volume One: 1521-1699. BRILL. ISBN 978-90-04-28888-1.
- Mugnai, Bruno; Flaherty, Christopher (23 September 2014). Der Lange Türkenkrieg (1593-1606) Vol. I: The long Turkish War. Soldiershop Publishing. ISBN 978-88-96519-91-2.
- Petrolini, Chiara (10 September 2024). "Captive Books, Captive Teachers. Spoils of the Long Turkish Wars in 17th-century Vienna". Erudition and the Republic of Letters. 9 (3): 309–335. doi:10.1163/24055069-09030003. hdl:11585/985619.
- Setton, Kenneth M (1991). Venice, Austria, and the Turks in the seventeenth century. American Philosophical Society.
