= Siege of Esztergom (1605) =

- Part of the Long Turkish War
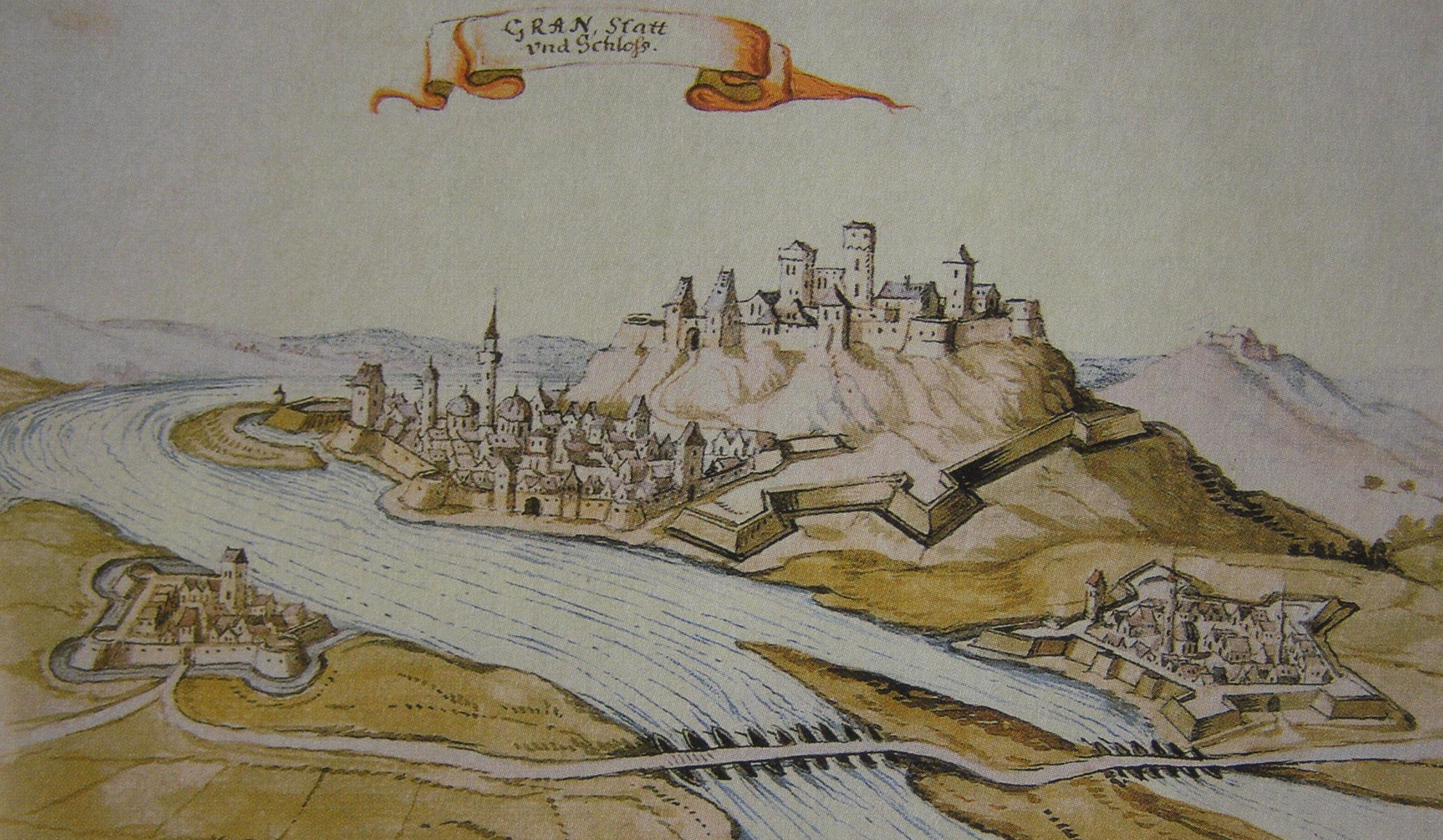
- Esztergom in 17th century
Date	30 August – 3 October 1605
Location	Esztergom, Hungary
Result	Ottoman victory

Belligerents
(Holy Roman Empire) Habsburg Empire	Ottoman Empire

Commanders and leaders
(Holy Roman Empire) Wilheim Öttingen † (Holy Roman Empire) Count Dampierre	Lala Mehmed Pasha

Strength
5,000–6,000 men	Unknown

Casualties and losses
Heavy	Unknown

The siege of Esztergom in 1605 was a military engagement between the Habsburg garrison of Esztergom and the Ottoman army led by the grand vizier Lala Mehmed Pasha. The town was captured by the Ottomans.

== Background ==
One of the Habsburg's greatest victories during the 15 Years' War was the recapture of Esztergom in 1595. The castle was crucial to the defense of Buda. The Ottomans made every effort to retake this vital location. They were unable to besiege Esztergom during the conflict, though, and their first opportunity to do so was in 1604. The Christians successfully defended themselves against the army under the command of Lala Mehmed during the siege, which took place between September 19 and October 13.

When the siege finally ended, Prince Bocskai's uprising had already begun, and by the end of 1605, he had taken control of all of Upper Hungary. Naturally, in the fall of 1605, the Ottomans attempted to capture Esztergom, taking advantage of the current hardships facing the Habsburgs.

Following the agreement reached between Bocskay and Lala Mohamed in the autumn of 1604, an even closer friendship in arms was later established between the two leading men. During the duration of the agreement, the Turks were not allowed to besiege any of Hungary's strengths, not even those held by Rudolph, but in addition to supporting Bocskay's armies, the Grand Vizier's main task would be to attack and occupy Austrian territories.

== Siege ==
Wilheim Öttingen, the captain of Esztergom, took command and was in charge of 5,000–6,000 soldiers. Before the siege, Öttinger let the Hungarian soldiers go because he didn't trust them. With nowhere else to go, these Hungarians joined Bocskai in the siege of Érsekújvár. On August 30, the Ottoman army arrived in Esztergom and began laying siege with a large army.

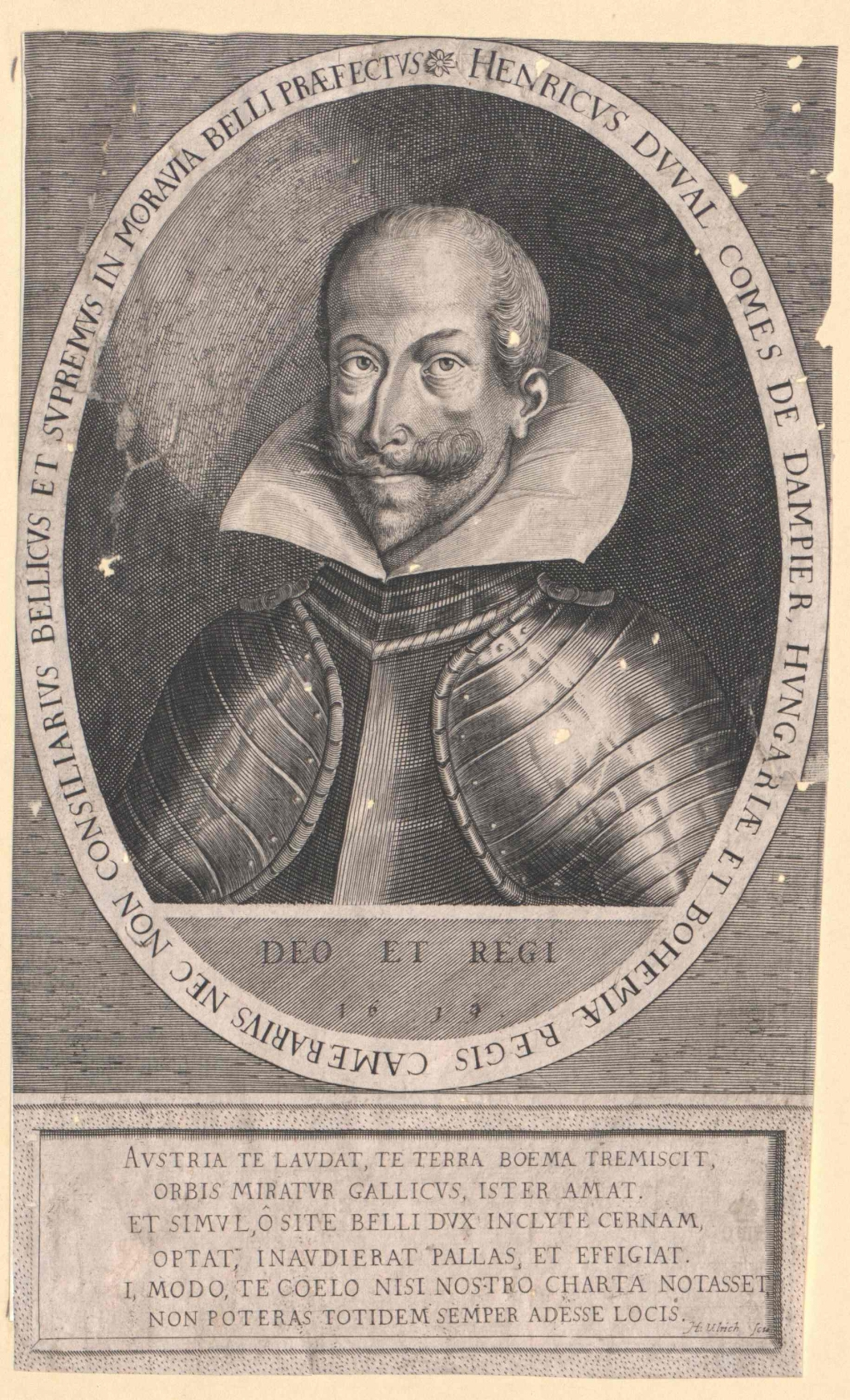
Count Dampierre

On September 8, the attack on Saint Thomas Hill was repelled by the Germans, who fiercely defended the fort. However, on September 16, the Ottomans ambushed the German soldiers and massacred every guard at the Saint Thomas fort, despite their valiant resistance. This important defense crumbled. The ramparts soon collapsed, along with the others. The rest of the garrison, around 5,000 men, retreated to the inner walls of the town.

The Ottomans then began bombarding the city walls. They then launched an assault on October 1. After suffering severe losses, the Germans left the city and retreated to the inner castle. In defending the town, about 1,000 of them perished. There, Öttingen perished in the fighting. Count Dampierre took command.

Numerous Germans were killed when the Ottoman miners buried mines beneath the castle's walls and set them on fire. Dampierre refused to give up the castle, despite repeated demands from the German guards. At last, the defenders were permitted to leave the town while retaining their weapons, and they surrendered the castle on October 3.

== Aftermath ==
On October 3, Esztergom was handed over to the Ottomans. Part of the Germans remained in the castle and joined the Ottomans; Dampierre led the rest, about 1,000 men, to Komárom. The German guards were later brought before trial, and the main culprits were executed, though Dampierre was spared. The 22year old Albrecht von Wallenstein, who had been among the defenders, went on to become one of the most important generals in the Thirty Years' War.
