= Szenttamás (Esztergom) =

Coordinates: 47°47′48″N 18°44′32″E

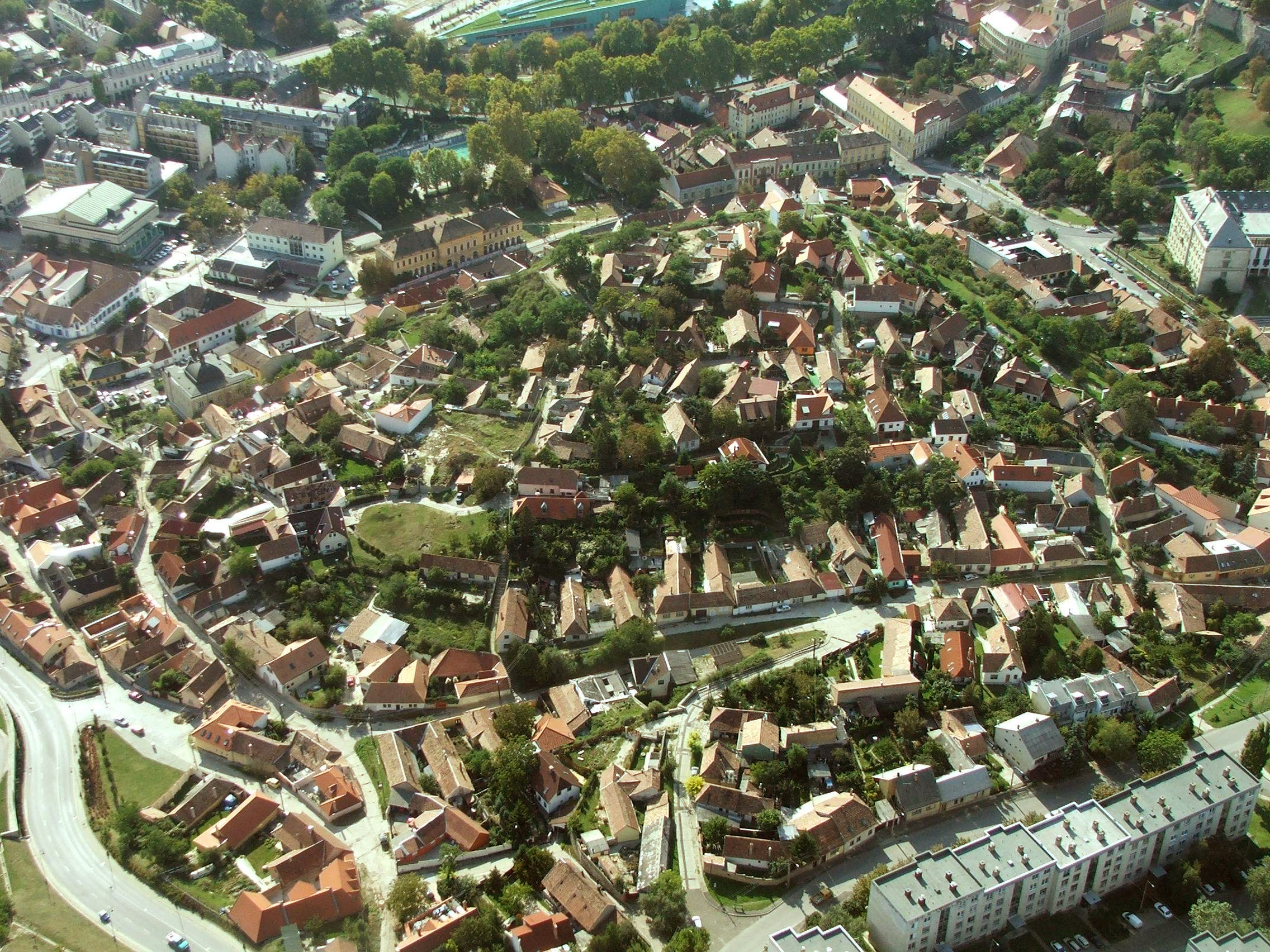
Aerial photograph, 2008

Szenttamás (meaning: "Saint Thomas" (for Saint Thomas Becket) is the eastern part of the city of Esztergom in Hungary, on the right bank of the river Danube. It was a separate village until 1895, when it was merged with the "Royal Esztergom" as 2nd district, along with neighboring Víziváros and Szentgyörgymező. It's located on the Szent Tamás Hill.

== Tourism ==
- Our Lady of Sorrows Chapel (Classicist) and Baroque Calvary on the top of the hill.
- Esztergom Synagogue
- Fürdő Szálló (Bath Hotel) in ruins
- Komárom-Esztergom County Archives (former Village Hall)
- Duna (Danube) Museum - Hungarian Museum of Water Administration and Environmental Protection

== Gallery ==
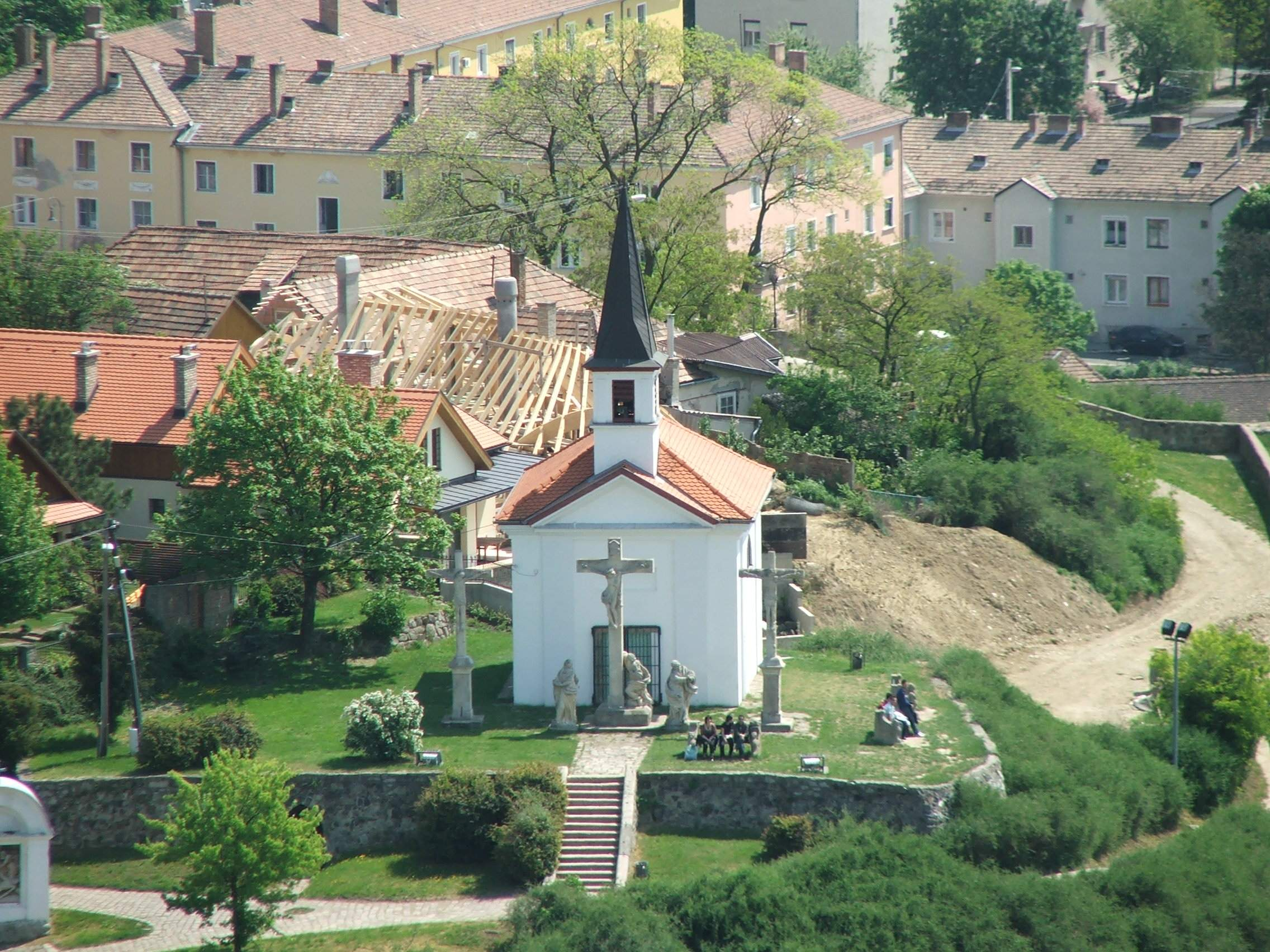
Calvary Chapel (Our Lady of Sorrows)

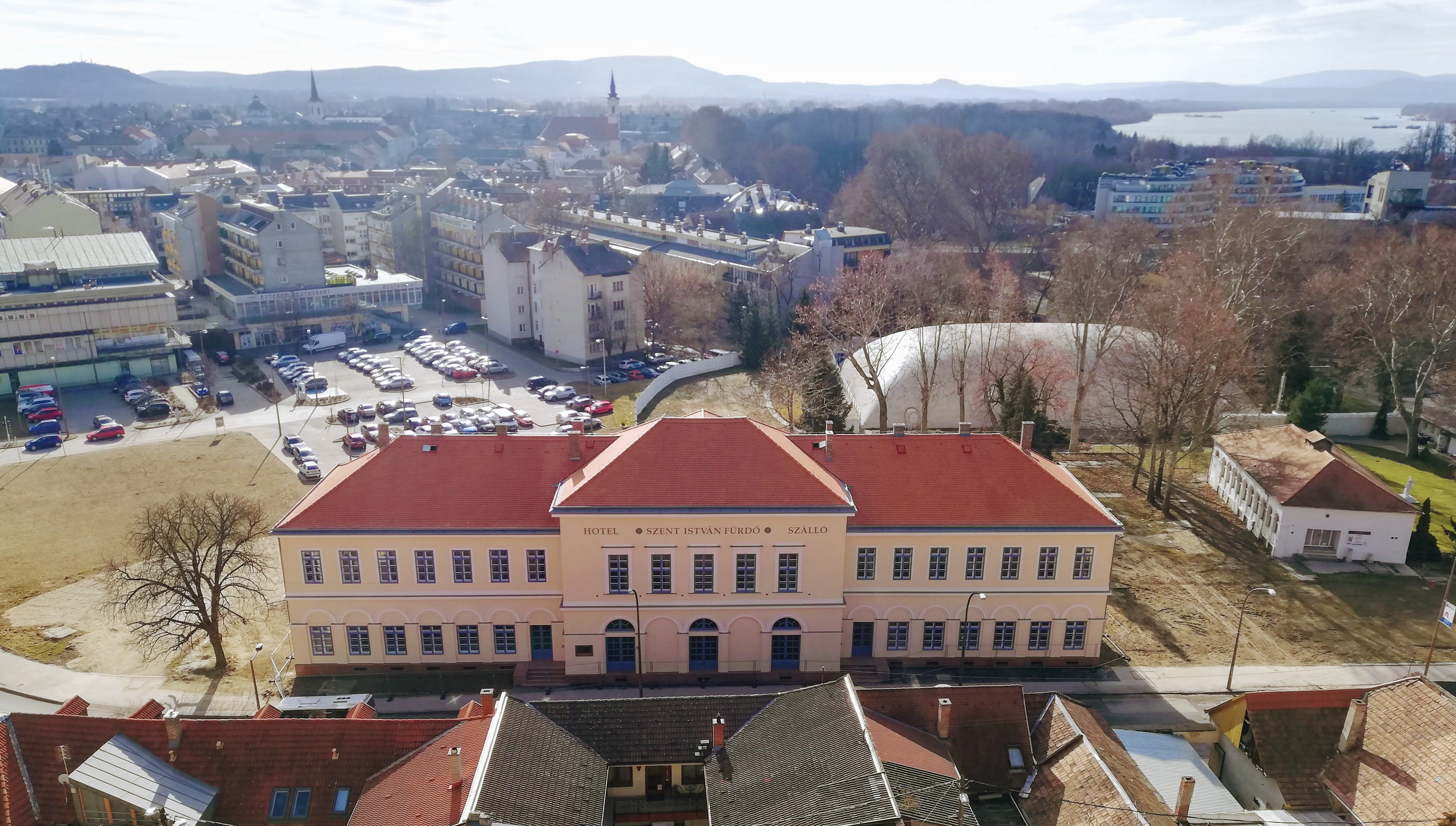
The Bath Hotel during renovations in 2022

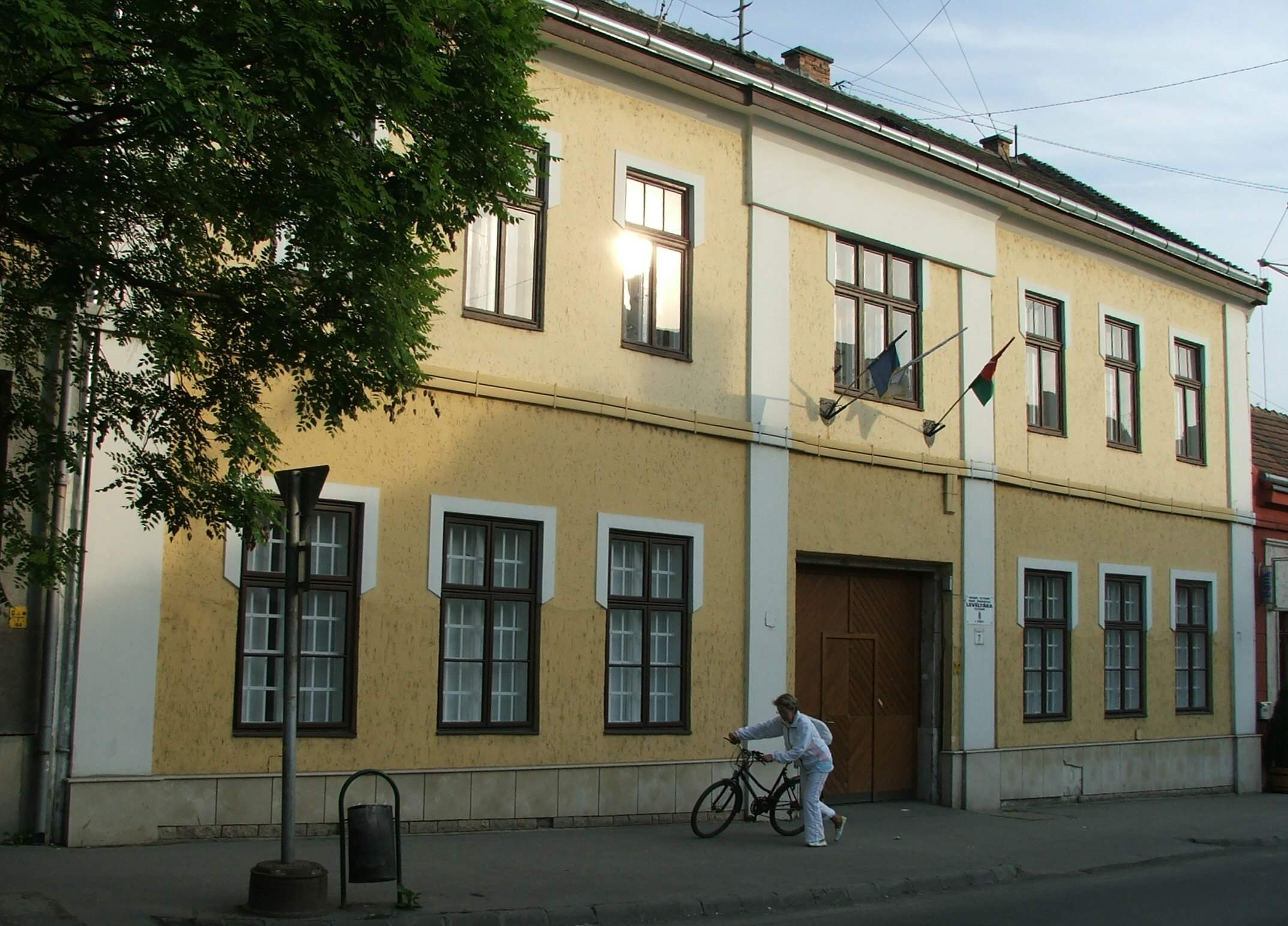
Former village hall, now Komárom-Esztergom County Archives

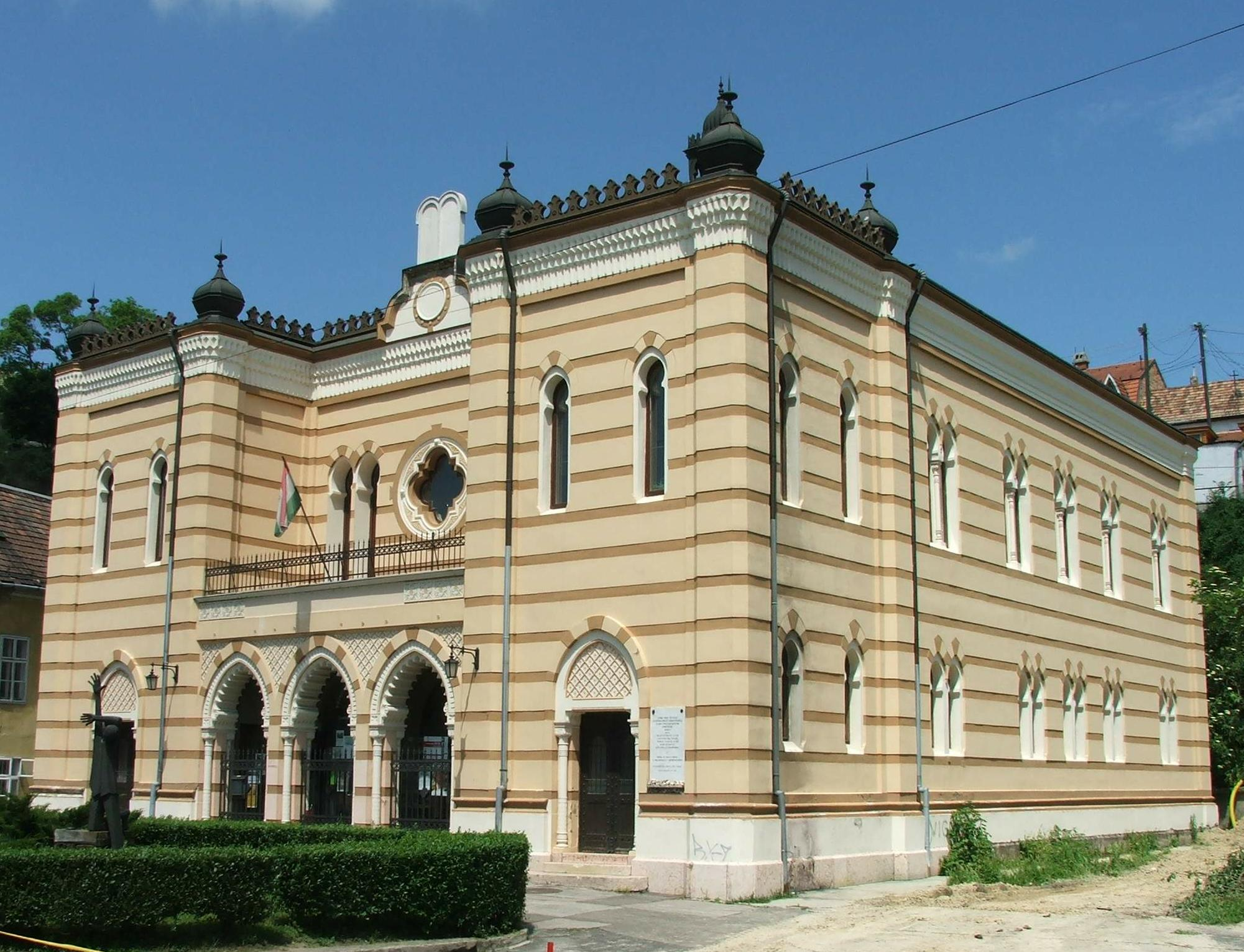
Former Esztergom Synagogue, now cultural center
