= Szentgyörgymező =

Hungarian city

Coordinates: 47°48′20″N 18°44′34″E

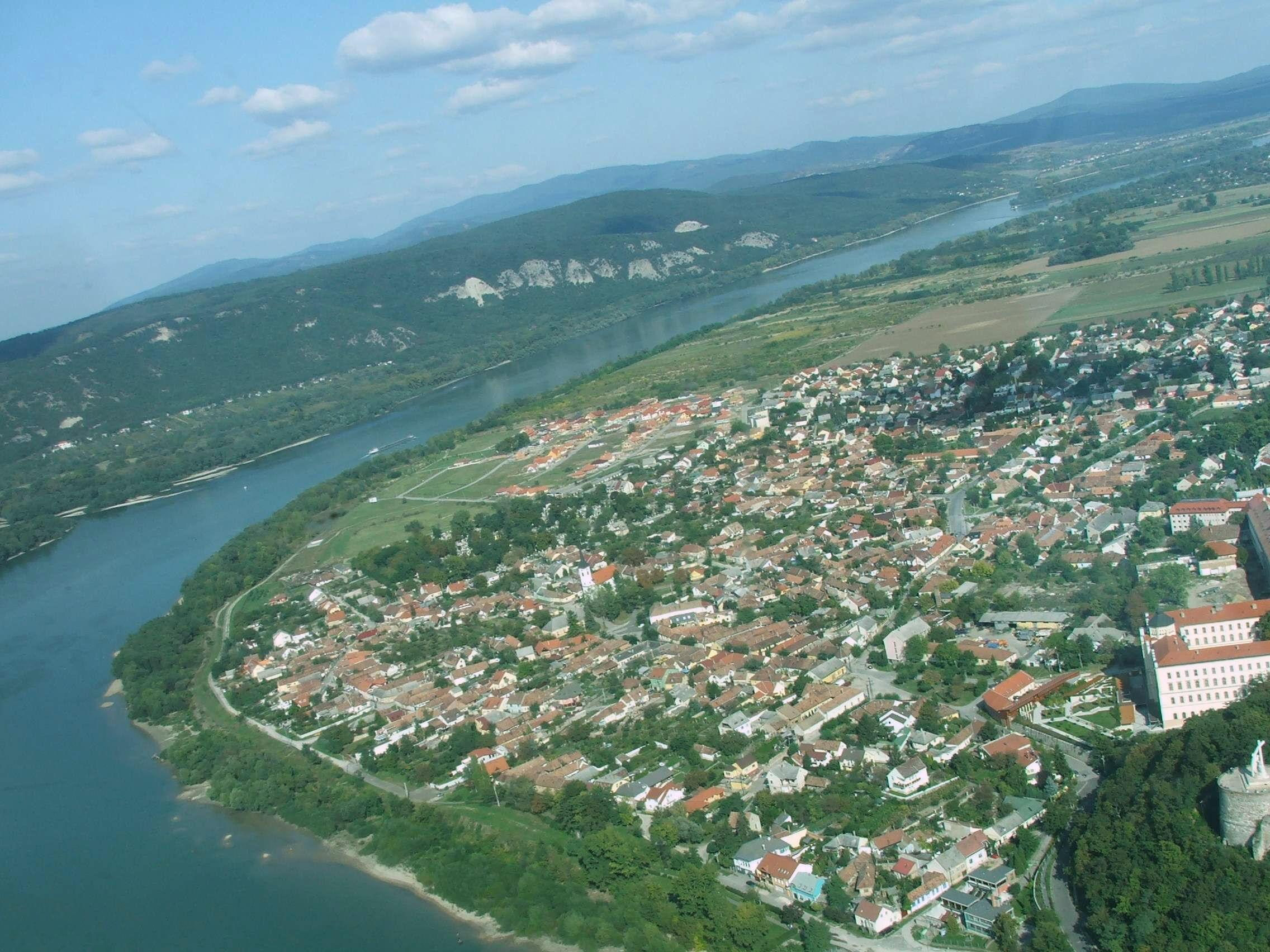
Aerial photograph, 2008

Szentgyörgymező (German: Georgenfeld, meaning: "St. George's field") is the northern part of the city of Esztergom in Hungary, on the right bank of the river Danube. It was a separate village until 1895, when it was merged with the "Royal Esztergom" as 4th district, along with neighboring Víziváros and Szenttamás. In the northern part of Szentgyörgymező lies a military cemetery, where 604 Hungarian and 175 Austrian soldiers of the 1848 revolution are buried. This is the biggest cemetery of the 1848 revolution.

== History ==
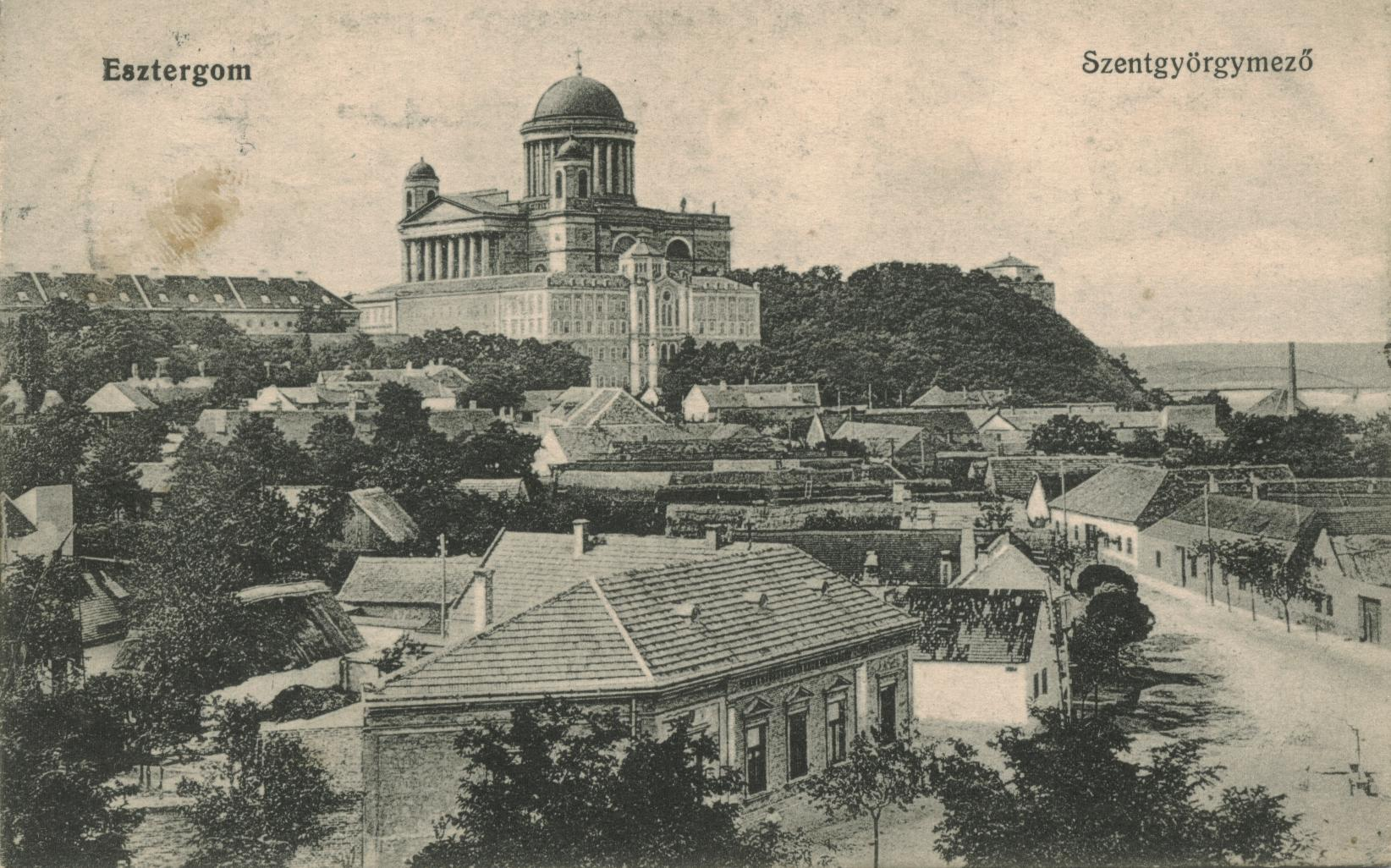
View from the church tower

The "St. George's provostry" was founded by Saint Stephen. The village was first mentioned in 1230. The baroque Roman Catholic church was built in 1785 on the site of the previous church, and the neoclassical Miklósffy-chapel - the cemetery chapel - was built in 1835. The village itself was a property of the archbishop of Esztergom. The Reading circle was founded in the 19th century, and still functions as the cultural centre of the district. In 1854 Szentgyörgymező was merged with Esztergom for the first time, but in 1868 they were separated by the wishes of Esztergom county. In 1891 the village had 325 households and had 2698 Hungarian inhabitants. In 1895 it was merged with Esztergom for the second - and final - time as the 4th district of Esztergom. Most of the people were wine-growers, 80% of them were living from agriculture, and Szentgyörgymező has kept its rural appearance. In the 1980s ruins of 10-12th century houses were discovered and excavated. László Paskai, cardinal of Hungary, former Archbishop of Esztergom lives here.

== Gallery ==
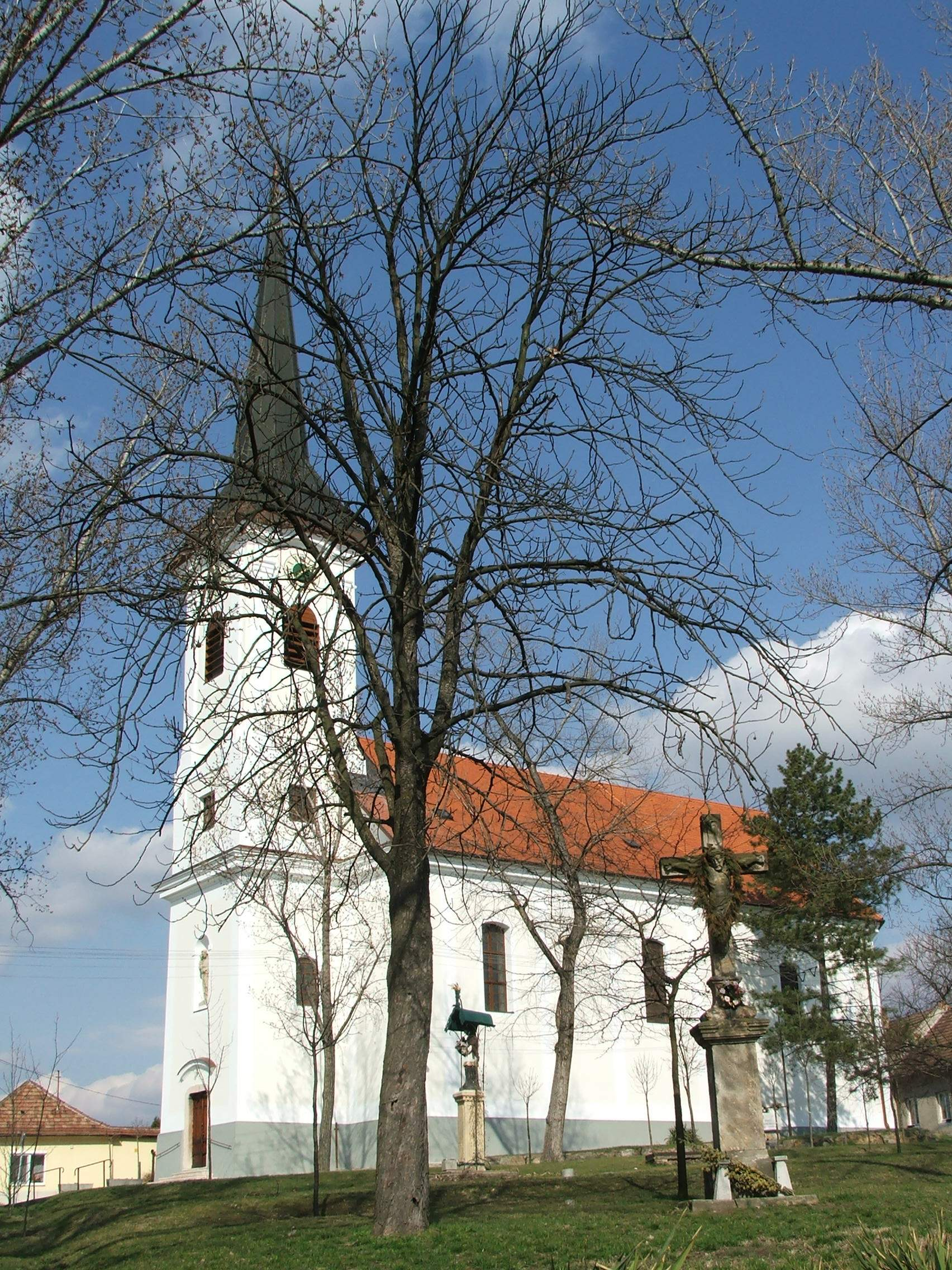
St George's church

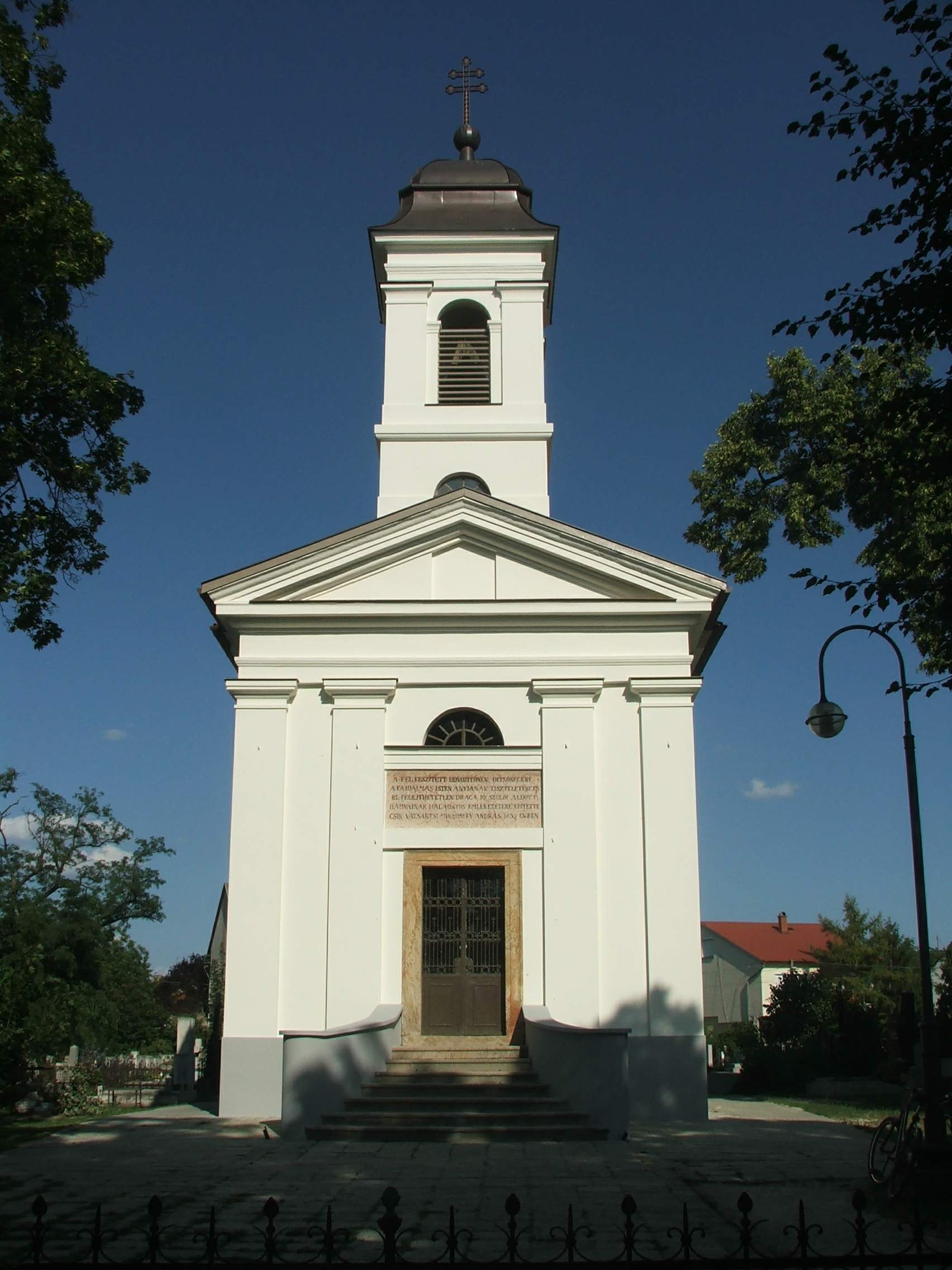
Miklósffy Chapel

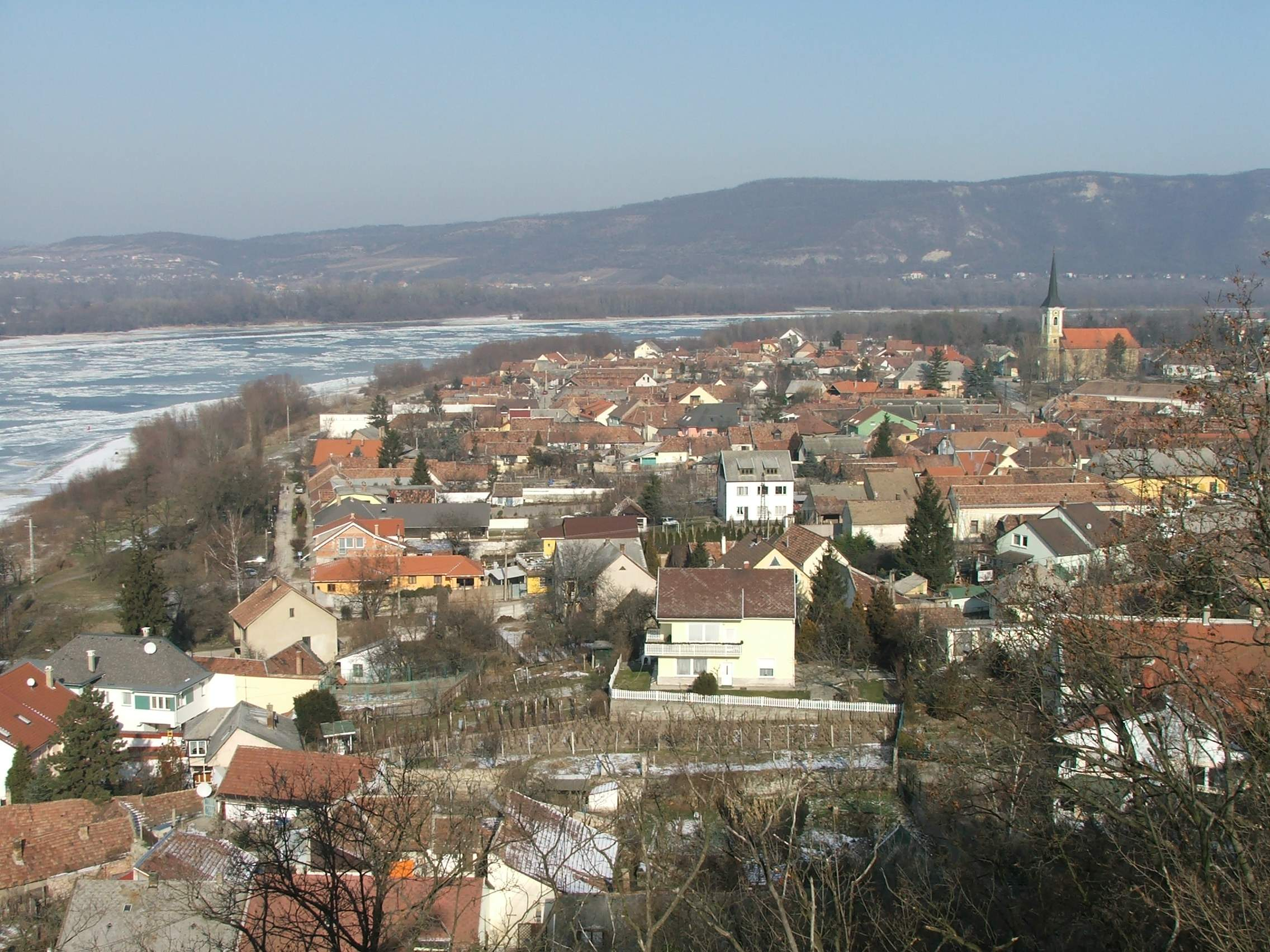
Szentgyörgymező as seen from Esztergom castle

== Sources ==
- Borovszy Samu: Esztergom Vármegye
- Esztergom-Budapesti Főegyházmegye
- Szent István városa – Esztergom története (szerk Meggyes Miklósné)
